= Berthelot =

Berthelot (English: /bɛərtəˈloʊ/, French: [bɛʁtəlo]) may refer to:

== People with the surname ==
- Amable Berthelot (1777–1847), Québécois lawyer and political figure
- André Berthelot (1862–1938), a secretary-general of La Grande Encyclopédie
- Anne Berthelot (born 1957), French professor of Medieval literature studies
- Armond J. Berthelot (1894–1961), French World War I flying ace
- Chantal Berthelot, member of the French National Assembly for French Guiana (2007–2017)
- Charles Honoré Berthelot La Villeheurnois (c. 1750-1799), French politician
- Francis Berthelot (born 1946), French science fiction author
- Henri Mathias Berthelot (1861–1931), French general during World War I
- Jean-Michel Berthelot (1945–2006), French sociologist and philosopher
- Jeanne Agnès Berthelot de Pléneuf, marquise de Prie (1698–1727)
- Marcellin Berthelot (1827–1907) chemist, author and diplomat
- Marco Berthelot (born 1972), Canadian curler
- Michel-Amable Berthelot Dartigny (1738–1815), Canadian politician
- Philippe Berthelot (1866–1934), French diplomat
- Pierre Berthelot (1943-2023), French mathematician
- René Berthelot (? – 1664), French actor from Molière's troupe, known as Du Parc and Gros René
- Sabin Berthelot (1794–1880), French naturalist and ethnologist
- Sophie Berthelot (1837–1907), wife of Marcellin and mother of André and Philippe, first woman interred in the Panthéon

== Places ==
- Berthelot River (Mégiscane River), a tributary of the Mégiscane River in Quebec, Canada
- Berthelot Lake (Mégiscane River), Quebec, Canada
- Avenue Berthelot, an avenue in the city of Lyon, France

== See also ==
- Berthelot's reagent in analytical chemistry, invented by Marcellin Berthelot
- General Berthelot, a Romanian commune named after Henri Mathias Berthelot, previously named Berthelot
