= René Berthelot (philosopher) =

René Berthelot (English: /bɛərtəˈloʊ/ ber-tə-LOH, French: [ʁəne bɛʁtəlo]; born 18 August 1872 in Sèvres, died 16 June 1960 in Paris) was a French philosopher, jurist and poet celebrated for his work in metaphysics and on political philosophy. He is noted for his analysis of Bergson and of Nietzsche. The Brussels School still draws on his work in philosophy of law, comparative philosophy and Eastern philosophy.

== Biography ==
Berthelot was the son of the chemist Marcellin Berthelot and his wife Sophie. He was a brother of the financier André Berthelot and of the diplomat Philippe Berthelot.

He studied at École normale supérieure from 1890, where he shared rooms with Léon Blum, André Beaunier and Célestin Bouglé.

== Career ==
=== Philosophy and the theory of law ===
A professor at the University of Brussels from 1897 till 1907, he influenced the Belgian Eugène Dupréel with his teaching. He was one of the founders of what is today known as “theory of law.” His works critiquing William James, Goethe and Nietzsche helped spread knowledge of these philosophers in France.

=== Comparative philosophy and Eastern philosophy ===
In 1938, in his published treatise on comparative philosophy, concentrating on Asian philosophy of science, he introduced the philosophical concept of “astrobiology” to designate the belief systems (mathematics, æsthetics, etc.) of ancient civilisations, drawing analogies between cosmic phenomena and earthly life. Berthelot's astrobiology should not be confused with the term “Exobiology” (appearing around 1960). He was also interested in Islamic philosophy.

=== Poetry ===
René Berthelot is the author of several hundred poems drawing on the traditions of Asia and the Islamic world, as well as on Dante, Shelley and Goethe.

== Works ==
- 1908: Évolutionnisme et platonisme: mélanges d'histoire de la philosophie et de l'histoire des sciences, F. Alcan, 330 pp.
- 1911: Un romantisme utilitaire, étude sur le mouvement pragmatiste, F. Alcan, 3 volumes.
  - 1. Le Pragmatisme chez Nietzsche et chez Poincaré, 416 pp.
  - 2. Le Pragmatisme chez Bergson, 358 pp.
  - 3. Le Pragmatisme religieux chez William James et chez les catholiques modernistes, 428 pp.
- 1926: Poèmes imités ou traduits de Shelley, Editions G. Crès et Cie.
- 1930: La Sagesse de Shakespeare et de Goethe, Gallimard - La Nouvelle Revue française, 239 pp.
- 1932: Science et philosophie chez Goethe, F. Alcan, 190 pp.
- 1938: La pensée de l'Asie et l'astrobiologie, Payot, 383 pp., republished in 1972
  - See a critique by Jean-Paul Roux in Revue de l'histoire des religions, vol. 188, 1975.
- 1957: Poèmes d'Orient et D'Occident, Presses des Editions Internationales
