= Principle of maximum work =

In the history of science, the principle of maximum work was a postulate concerning the relationship between chemical reactions, heat evolution, and the potential work produced there from. The principle was developed in approximate form in 1875 by French chemist Marcellin Berthelot, in the field of thermochemistry, and then in 1876 by American mathematical physicist Willard Gibbs, in the field of thermodynamics, in a more accurate form. Berthelot's version was essentially: "every pure chemical reaction is accompanied by evolution of heat." (and that this yields the maximum amount of work). The effects of irreversibility, however, showed this version to be incorrect. This was rectified, in thermodynamics, by incorporating the concept of entropy.

== Overview ==
Berthelot independently enunciated a generalization (commonly known as Berthelot's Third Principle, or Principle of Maximum Work), which may be briefly stated as: every pure chemical reaction is accompanied by evolution of heat. Whilst this principle is undoubtedly applicable to the great majority of chemical actions under ordinary conditions, it is subject to numerous exceptions, and cannot therefore be taken (as its authors originally intended) as a secure basis for theoretical reasoning on the connection between thermal effect and chemical affinity. The existence of reactions which are reversible on slight alteration of conditions at once invalidates the principle, for if the action proceeding in one direction evolves heat, it must absorb heat when proceeding in the reverse direction. As the principle was abandoned even by its authors, it is now only of historical importance, although for many years it exerted considerable influence on thermochemical research.

Thus, to summarize, in 1875 by the French chemist Marcellin Berthelot which stated that chemical reactions will tend to yield the maximum amount of chemical energy in the form of work as the reaction progresses.

In 1876, however, through the works of Willard Gibbs and others to follow, the work principle was found to be a particular case of a more general statement:

For all thermodynamic processes between the same initial and final state, the delivery of work is a maximum for a reversible process.

The principle of work was a precursor to the development of the thermodynamic concept of free energy.

== Thermochemistry ==
In thermodynamics, the Gibbs free energy or Helmholtz free energy is essentially the energy of a chemical reaction "free" or available to do external work. Historically, the "free energy" is a more advanced and accurate replacement for the thermochemistry term “affinity” used by chemists of olden days to describe the “force” that caused chemical reactions. The term dates back to at least the time of Albertus Magnus in 1250.

According to Nobelist and chemical engineering professor Ilya Prigogine: “as motion was explained by the Newtonian concept of force, chemists wanted a similar concept of ‘driving force’ for chemical change? Why do chemical reactions occur, and why do they stop at certain points? Chemists called the ‘force’ that caused chemical reactions affinity, but it lacked a clear definition.

During the entire 18th century, the dominant view in regard to heat and light was that put forward by Isaac Newton, called the “Newtonian hypothesis”, which stated that light and heat are forms of matter attracted or repelled by other forms of matter, with forces analogous to gravitation or to chemical affinity.

In the 19th century, the French chemist Marcellin Berthelot and the Danish chemist Julius Thomsen had attempted to quantify chemical affinity using heats of reaction. In 1875, after quantifying the heats of reaction for a large number of compounds, Berthelot proposed the “principle of maximum work” in which all chemical changes occurring without intervention of outside energy tend toward the production of bodies or of a system of bodies which liberate heat.

== Thermodynamics ==
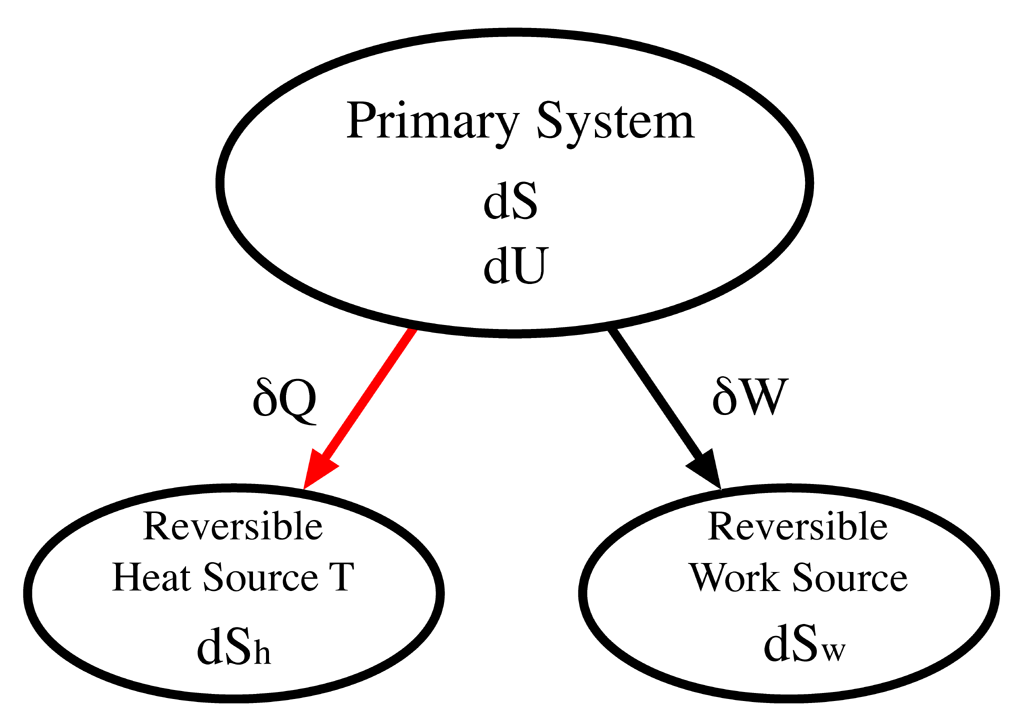
Thermodynamic systems in the maximum work theorem. dU is the energy lost to the reversible heat system as heat energy δQ and to the reversible work system as work δW.

With the development of the first two laws of thermodynamics in the 1850s and 60s, heats of reaction and the work associated with these processes were given a more accurate mathematical basis. In 1876, Willard Gibbs unified all of this in his 300-page "On the Equilibrium of Heterogeneous Substances". Suppose, for example, we have a general thermodynamic system, called the "primary" system and that we mechanically connect it to a "reversible work source". A reversible work source is a system which, when it does work, or has work done to it, does not change its entropy. It is therefore not a heat engine and does not suffer dissipation due to friction or heat exchanges. A simple example would be a frictionless spring, or a weight on a pulley in a gravitational field. Suppose further, that we thermally connect the primary system to a third system, a "reversible heat source". A reversible heat source may be thought of as a heat source in which all transformations are reversible. For such a source, the heat energy δQ added will be equal to the temperature of the source (T) times the increase in its entropy. (If it were an irreversible heat source, the entropy increase would be larger than δQ/T)

Define:

$-dU\,$	The loss of internal energy by the primary system
$dS\,$	The gain in entropy of the primary system
$\delta W\,$	The gain in internal energy of the reversible work source
$dS_w\,$	The gain in entropy of the reversible work source
$\delta Q\,$	The gain in internal energy of the reversible heat source
$dS_h\,$	The gain in entropy of the reversible heat source
$T\,$	The temperature of the reversible heat source

We may now make the following statements

$-dU=\delta Q + \delta W\,$	(First law of thermodynamics)
$dS+dS_h+dS_w\ge 0\,$	(Second law of thermodynamics)
$dS_w=0\,$	(Reversible work source)
$\delta Q = T dS_h\,$	(Reversible heat source)

Eliminating $dS_w$, $\delta Q$, and $dS_h$ gives the following equation:

$$\delta W\le -(dU-TdS)$$

When the primary system is reversible, the equality will hold and the amount of work delivered will be a maximum. Note that this will hold for any reversible system which has the same values of dU and dS .

== See also ==
- Chemical thermodynamics
- Thomsen-Berthelot principle
- Thermochemistry
