= Thomsen–Berthelot principle =

Hypothesis in the history of thermochemistry

In thermochemistry, the Thomsen–Berthelot principle is a hypothesis in the history of chemistry which argued that all chemical changes are accompanied by the production of heat and that processes which occur will be ones in which the most heat is produced. This principle was formulated in slightly different versions by the Danish chemist Julius Thomsen in 1854 and by the French chemist Marcellin Berthelot in 1864. This early postulate in classical thermochemistry became the controversial foundation of a research program that would last three decades.

This principle came to be associated with what was called the thermal theory of affinity, which postulated that the heat evolved in a chemical reaction was the true measure of its affinity.

== Limitations ==
The experimental objections to the Thomsen–Berthelot principle include incomplete dissociation, reversibility, and spontaneous endothermic processes. Such cases were dismissed by orthodox thermochemist as outliers not covered by the principle, or the experiments were manipulated to fit it through with somewhat contrived justifications was later disproved. In 1873, Thomsen acknowledged that his theory might not have universal or definitive credibility. Later, under newly created chemical thermodynamics framework, the principle was explained to only be valid as an idealization under extreme conditions (i.e., absolute zero). Thomsen openly admitted that his initial understanding was merely a close estimate of the reality, emphasizing that while chemical reactions typically release heat, this heat isn't always a trustworthy indicator of the strength of the bonds formed. On the other hand, Berthelot, was more resistant and continued to assert the validity of the principle until 1894. In 1882 the German scientist Hermann von Helmholtz proved that affinity was not given by the heat evolved in a chemical reaction but rather by the maximum work, or free energy, produced when the reaction was carried out reversibly.

== See also ==
- Principle of maximum work
