= Indophenol =

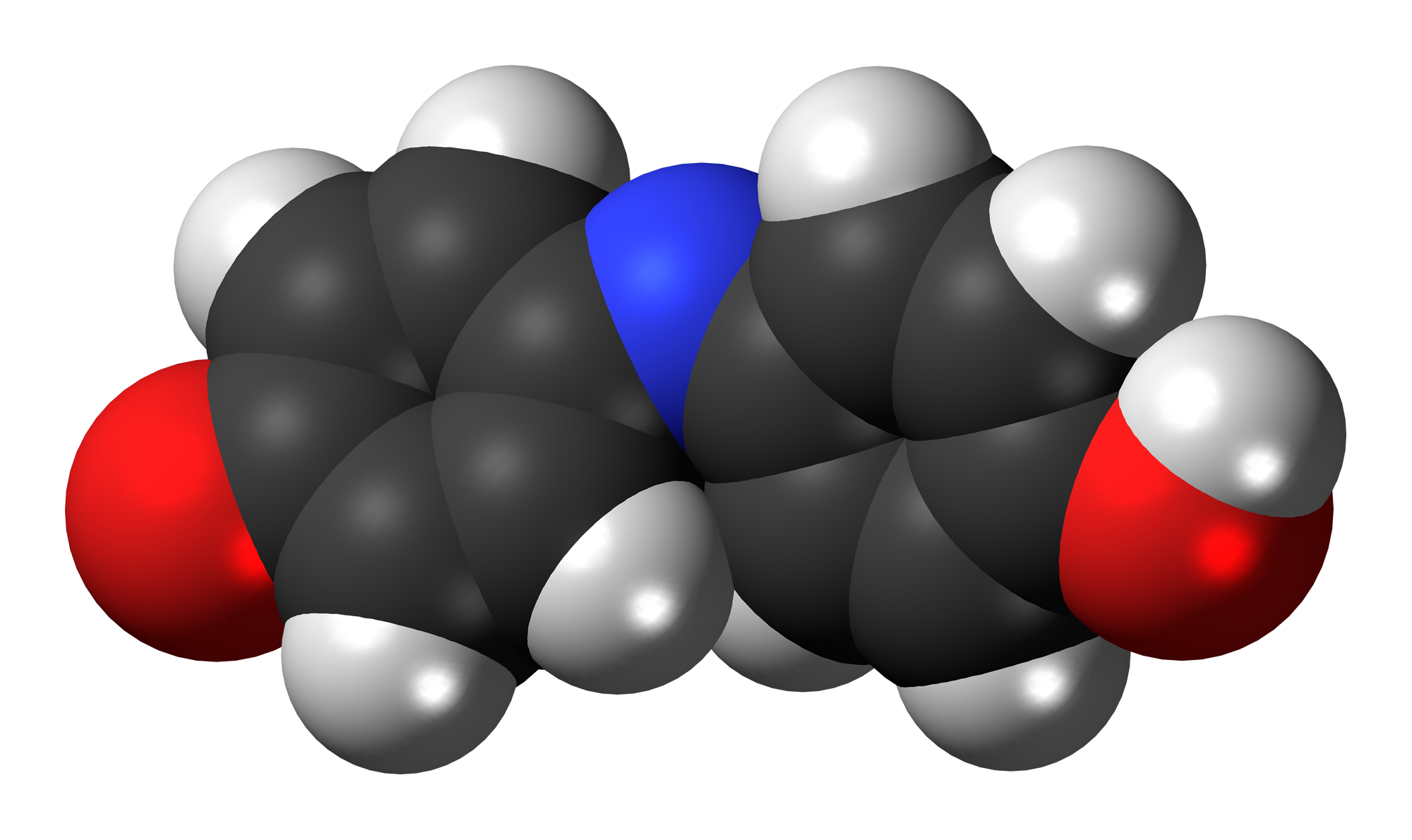

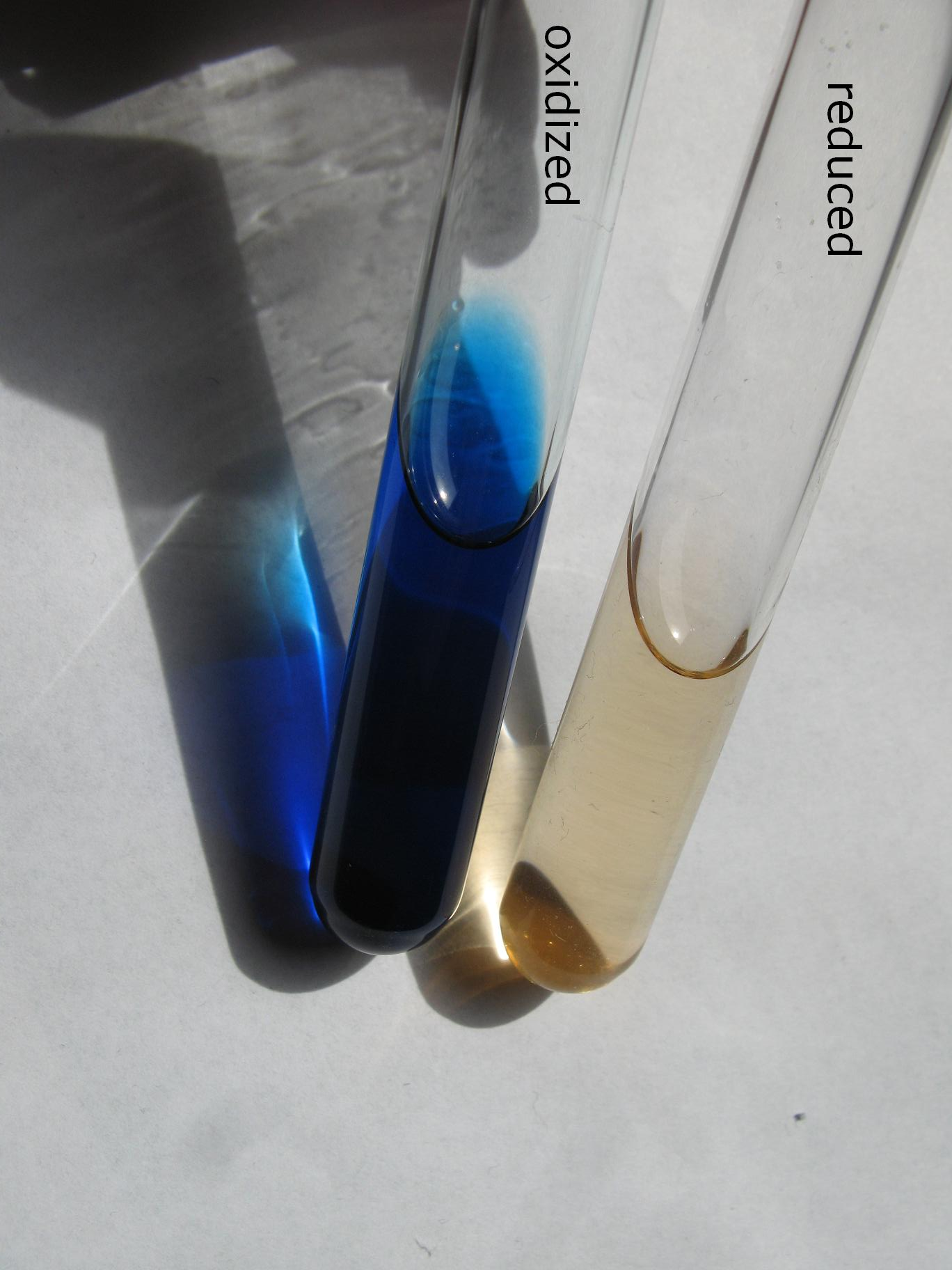

Names
- IUPAC name 4-(4-hydroxyphenyl)iminocyclohexa-2,5-dien-1-one
- Other names Benzenoneindophenol, phenolindophenol

Identifiers
CAS Number	500-85-6
3D model (JSmol)	Interactive image
ChemSpider	9951
ECHA InfoCard	100.007.194
PubChem CID	10379
UNII	BW444H326B
CompTox Dashboard (EPA)	DTXSID2075425
- InChI: InChI=1S/C12H9NO2/c14-11-5-1-9(2-6-11)13-10-3-7-12(15)8-4-10/h1-8,14H Key: RSAZYXZUJROYKR-UHFFFAOYSA-N; InChI=1/C12H9NO2/c14-11-5-1-9(2-6-11)13-10-3-7-12(15)8-4-10/h1-8,14H Key: RSAZYXZUJROYKR-UHFFFAOYAS
- SMILES: O=C/2/C=C\C(=N\c1ccc(O)cc1)\C=C\2

Properties
Chemical formula	C_{12}H_{9}NO_{2}
Molar mass	199.209 g·mol^{−1}
Appearance	Reddish-blue powder
Melting point	above 300 °C
- Except where otherwise noted, data are given for materials in their standard state (at 25 °C [77 °F], 100 kPa). verify (what is ?) Infobox references

Indophenol is an organic compound with the formula OC_{6}H_{4}NC_{6}H_{4}OH. It is deep blue dye that is the product of the Berthelot's reaction, a common test for ammonia. The indophenol group, with various substituents in place of OH and various ring substitutions, is found in many dyes used in hair coloring and textiles.

Indophenol is used in hair dyes, lubricants, redox materials, liquid crystal displays, fuel cells and chemical-mechanical polishing. It is an environmental pollutant and is toxic to fish.

== Berthelot test ==
In the Berthelot test (1859), a sample suspected of containing ammonia is treated with sodium hypochlorite and phenol. The formation of indophenol is used to determine ammonia and paracetamol by spectrophotometry. Other phenols can be used. Dichlorophenol-indophenol (DCPIP), a form of indophenol, is often used to determine the presence of vitamin C (ascorbic acid).

== Related compounds ==
Indophenol blue is a different compound with systematic name N-(p-dimethylaminophenyl)-1,4-naphthoquinoneimine.

Indophenol blue
