= Emil Jungfleisch =

- Born: 21 December 1839; Paris, France
- Died: 24 April 1916 (aged 76)
- Citizenship: France
- Scientific career
- Thesis: Recherches sur les dérivés chlorés de la benzine. (1868)

Prof Emil Clement Jungfleisch FRSE MIF (1839-1916) was a French biochemist and pharmacist. He studied molecular dissymmetry.

== Life ==
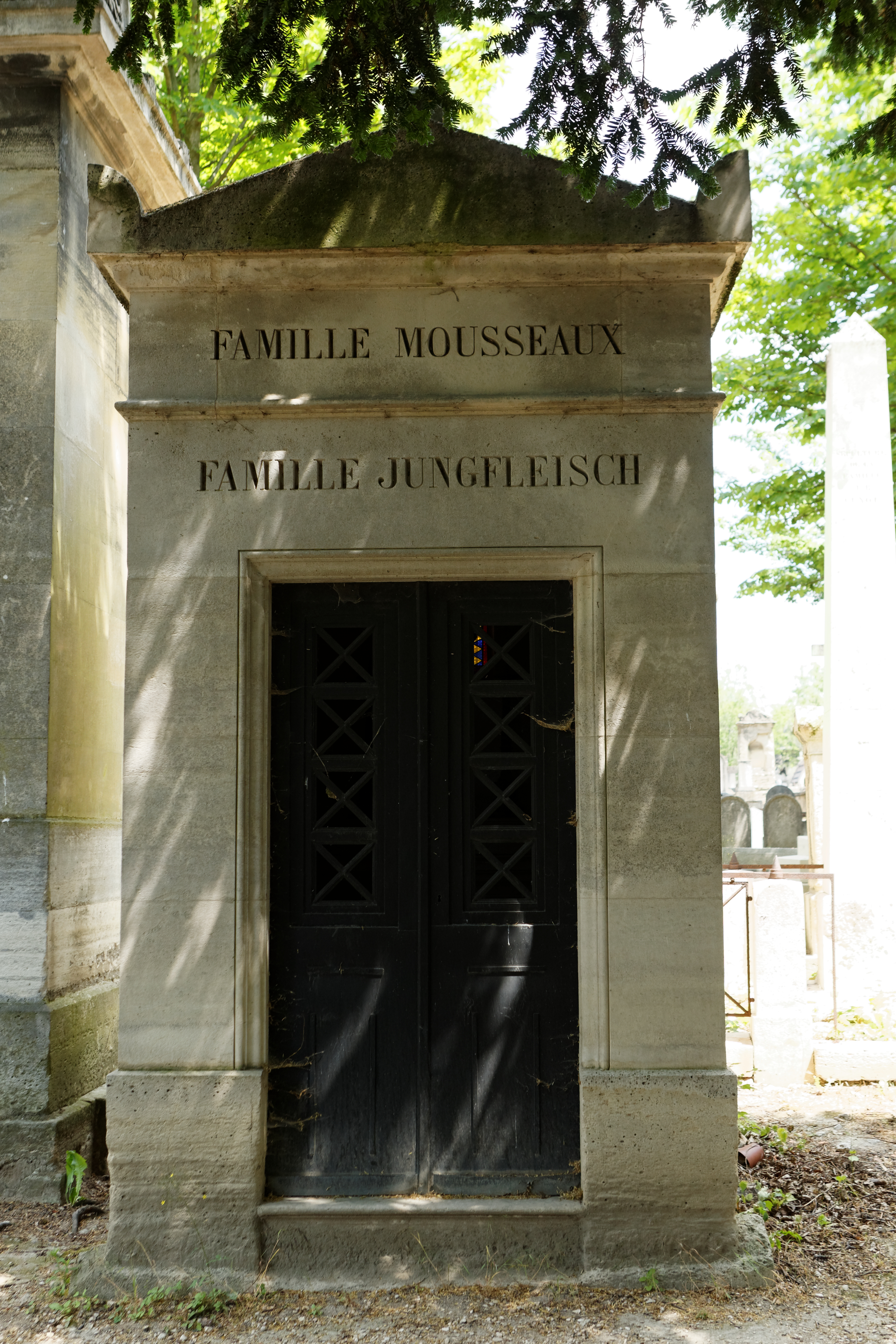
The grave of Emil Jungfleish, Pere la Chaise

He was born in Paris on 21 December 1839. He studied at the Ecole Superieure de Pharmacie in Paris. He gained a BSc in Sciences in 1866. In 1869 he began assisting at his alma mater in Paris and in 1876 was made Professor of Organic Chemistry. In 1908 he succeeded Pierre Eugene Marcellin Berthelot as Professor of Chemistry at the College of France.

In 1880 he was elected a member of the National Academy of Medicine and a member of the Academy of Sciences in 1909. In 1913 he was elected an Honorary Fellow of the Royal Society of Edinburgh.

He died on 24 April 1916. He is buried in the 25th Division of Père Lachaise Cemetery in Paris.

== Artistic recognition ==
In 1910 he was sculpted in profile by Paul Richer. A copy of the plaque created is held at the Carnavalet Museum.
