= Banque Industrielle de Chine =

Former Paris-based bank

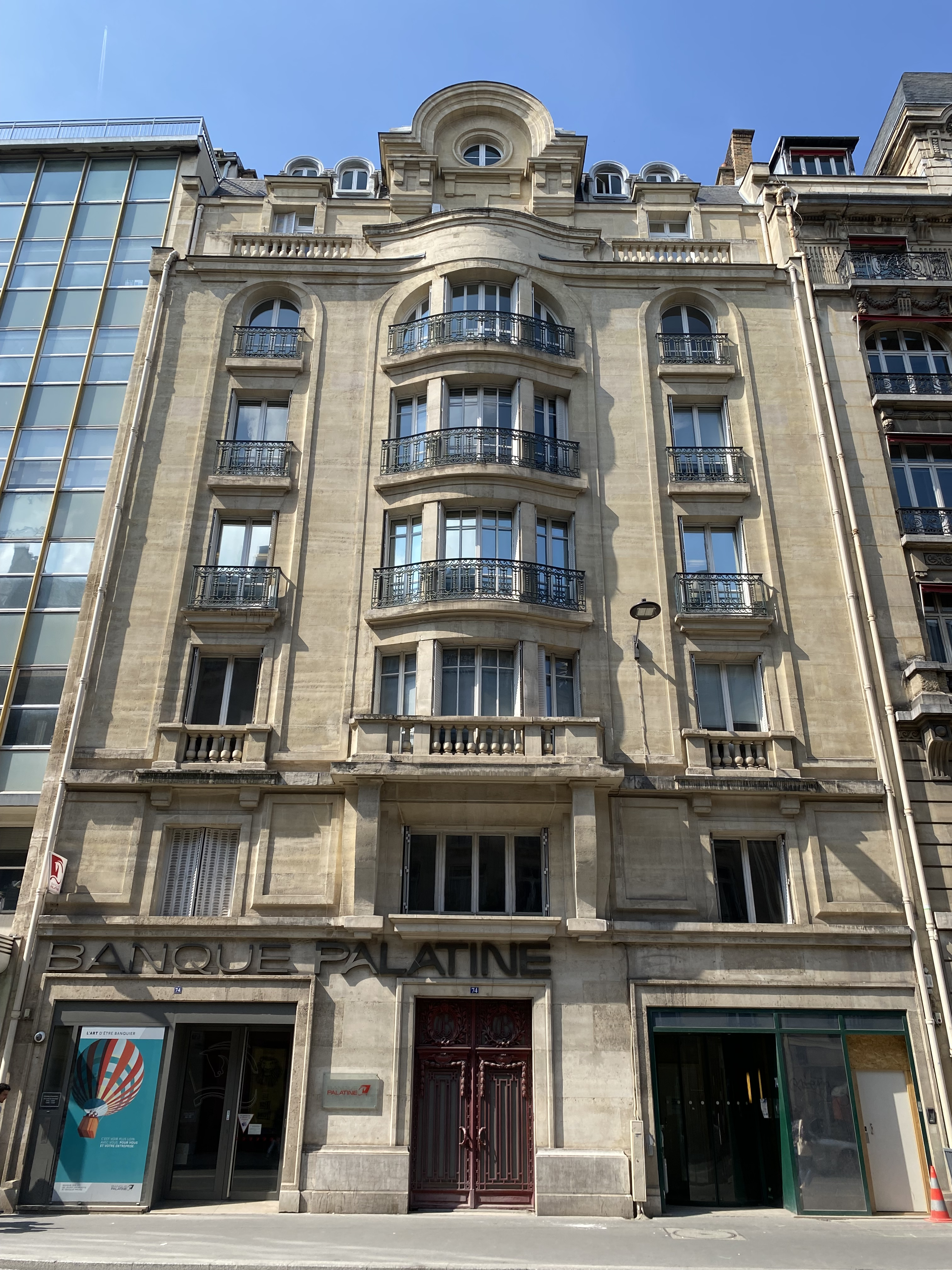
Former BIC headquarters at 74 rue Saint-Lazare, Paris

The Banque Industrielle de Chine (French pronunciation: [bɑ̃k ɛ̃dystʁijɛl də ʃin], lit. 'Industrial Bank of China', abbr. BIC; Chinese: 中法實業銀行) was a French bank with its main activities in China and French Indochina. It was created in 1913, expanded rapidly, but closed in 1921 because of the political context in China, causing a political controversy in France. Its activity was continued by the Franco-Chinese Bank, in China until the 1950s and in Indochina until the 1970s.

== Background ==
From the late 19th century, the Banque de l'Indochine was tasked by the French government to support French commercial, industrial and strategic interests in China, but its conservative stance elicited frustration in French official circles. It was perceived in contrast to the greater dynamism of its British and German counterparts, especially the Deutsch-Asiatische Bank. In an internal Foreign Ministry note of 13 December 1905, diplomat Philippe Berthelot, who in 1907 would become the ministry's head of Asian affairs, developed the case for a new institution that would take over the existing Chinese offices of the Banque de l'Indochine and finance accelerated French inroads into the Chinese market.

These concerns became more salient following the 1911 Revolution in China, as French diplomats and political forces such as the Radical Party were eager to support the republican party, Republic of China, whereas the Banque de l'Indochine was closer to conservative and reactionary circles which did not share the same enthusiasm. In Beijing, Alexis-Joseph Pernotte, a banker who had lived in China since 1903 and had led the Tianjin branch of the Banque de l'Indochine since 1910, promoted the project of a new bank, and in July 1912 obtained a preliminary agreement from Prime Minister Lu Zhengxiang and Finance Minister Xiong Xiling that the Chinese government would support the venture and subscribe one-third of its initial capital. During a session of the National Assembly on 30 January 1913, Xiong presented the future bank as an instrument of Chinese sovereignty against the so-called China Consortium of established foreign banks and their colonial powers, and referred to it as "our bank". Contrary to the other European banks in China, this bank had Chinese capital and was primarily focused on infrastructure development. Xiong emphasized the depth of the Paris financial market, which the bank would allow the Chinese government to access for its future borrowing, thus justifying the Franco-Chinese partnership from the standpoint of China's national interest..

== Creation and expansion ==
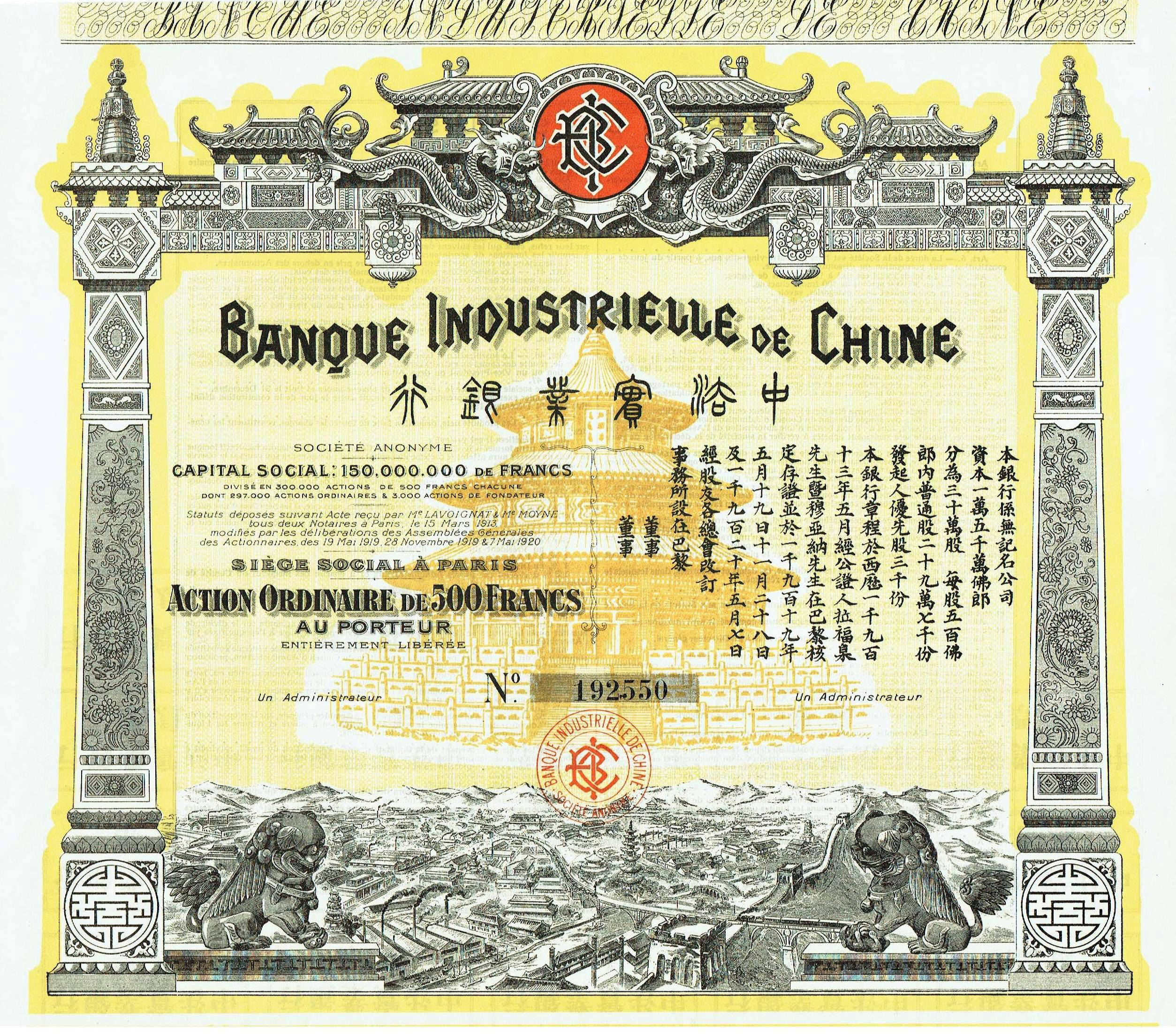
Share certificate, 1920

The bank was formally created in two consecutive assembly meetings in Paris, on 28 June 1913 and 5 July 1913. In line with the previous year's agreement, the Chinese government owned a third of the bank's equity capital. From the start and until the closure in 1921, the bank's chairman (French: président du conseil) was Philippe's brother André Berthelot -who was chosen by both the French and the Chinese- and Pernotte was its chief executive. Businessman Charles Victor and a bank he controlled, the Société auxiliaire de Crédit, were instrumental in the bank's initial financing. Victor's business ventures collapsed the next year, however, and the Société auxiliaire de Crédit was liquidated in December 1914.

The bank was incorporated in Paris, where its board of directors held its meetings. On 16 March 1914 it moved its seat to 74 rue Saint-Lazare, after having initially been hosted in Charles Victor's business offices. In China, it was managed from Beijing, and opened a branch in Shanghai in 1914. It had its first major project in 1914, underwriting bonds for the construction of port facilities in Pukou District, across the Yangtze from Nanjing. It further opened offices in Tianjin in early 1916, in Hong Kong and Saigon in 1917, and sub-offices of the latter in Hanoi and across the Chinese border in Yunnan-fu (now Kunming) in 1918. That same year, the bank planned a major new building for its branch in Shanghai, on the corner of the newly created Avenue Edward VII (now Yan'an Road) and the Bund. In 1918, like the Banque de l'Indochine, it opened an office in Vladivostok to serve the Allied military base there during the Siberian intervention.

The bank's expansion accelerated with the business expansion that immediately followed the end of World War I. In March 1920, it became the first French bank licensed to operate in New York. By late 1920 it had added more offices in China (Fuzhou, Guangzhou, Hankou, Mukden, and Shantou) and elsewhere (Antwerp, London, Lyon, Marseille, Singapore, and Yokohama).

== Restructuring and controversy ==
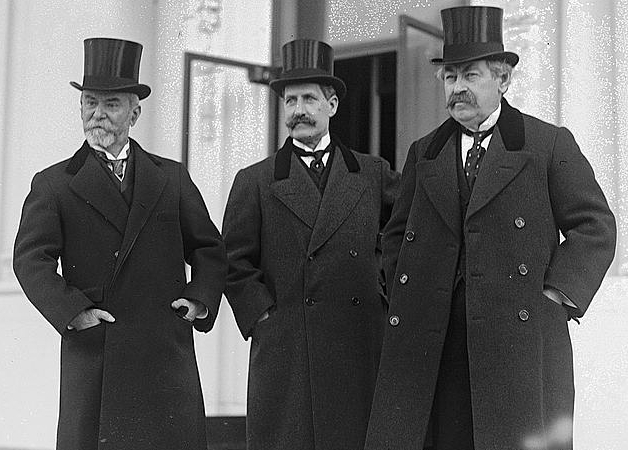
Philippe Berthelot (center), the BIC's original promoter and brother of its founding chairman, at the Washington Naval Conference in 1921 with Prime Minister Aristide Briand (right) and ambassador Jean Jules Jusserand (left)

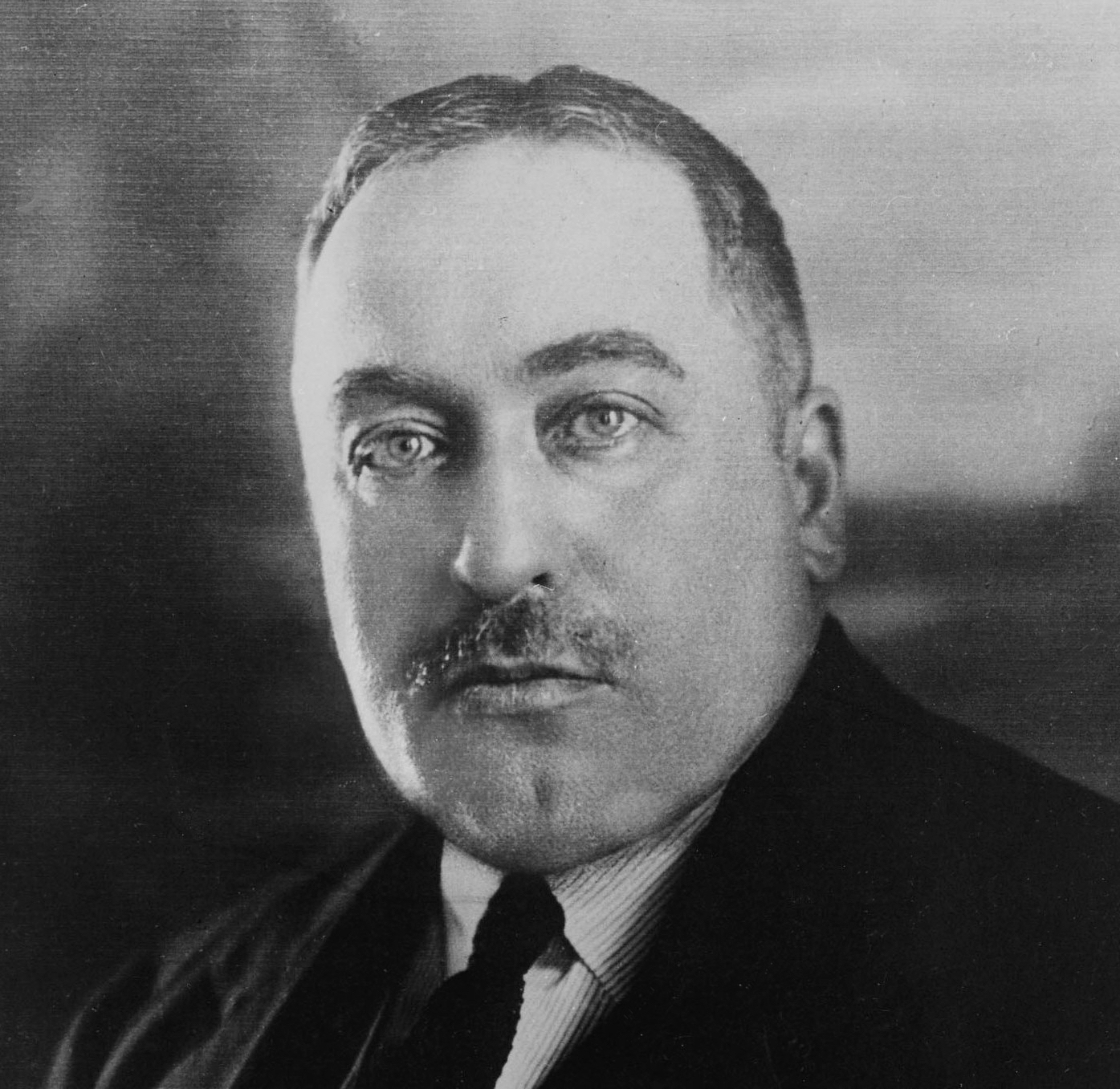
Horace Finaly, chief executive of the Banque de Paris et des Pays-Bas, was instrumental in the BIC's restructuring

In early 1921, financial stress became acute largely because of the Chinese change of regime. As an attempt to secure the situation, several board members had to resigned in early February 1921. In late January, the French government and the Bank of France fostered a collective support package with contributions from the government of French Indochina (30 million Francs), the Banque de Paris et des Pays-Bas (22 million), the Banque de l'Indochine (16 million), and other banks (Bankers Trust, Société Générale, Banque Française pour le Commerce et l'Industrie, Rothschilds, Sudameris, Banca Commerciale Italiana, Crédit Foncier d'Algérie et de Tunisie, Banque de la Seine, and Crédit Mobilier Français) for lesser individual amounts adding up to 65 million, to which the government added £150,000 that it had recently withdrawn from the BIC's London branch. Despite this temporary relief, the BIC faced runs on its operations in China during the riots and the change of political power. It eventually closed on 29 June 1921 at the Tribunal de commerce de la Seine. so that the funds could be transferred to a new entity.

From that point, the issues of the Banque Industrielle de Chine became a matter of major public attention and generated a major business-related controversy, including repeated debates in France's Chamber of Deputies. Even before that moment of public salience, in the spring of 1921 when the BIC's financial distress was only known to well-informed Parisian circles, two opposite camps had coalesced around it. The coalition defending the bank and advocating a bailout by the French government included much of the Foreign Ministry - where Philippe Berthelot was then Secretary-General, the highest-ranking civil servant - as well as the Banque de Paris et des Pays-Bas (BPPB); and at the political level, Aristide Briand, Foreign Minister and simultaneously Prime Minister, and Louis Loucheur, Minister of Liberated Regions. The BPPB's chief executive Horace Finaly was close to Philippe Berthelot, as were many Parisian diplomacy-connected luminaries including Paul Claudel, Colette, Paul Morand, and Saint-John Perse. The anti-BIC coalition included much of the Finance Ministry, led by the conservative Paul Doumer, and the Banque de l'Indochine (where Doumer had invested the major part of his private funds).

The intermingling of business, political and national interests was a major dimension of the related debates. The pro-BIC narrative reminded the bank's difficulties as caused by a general economic and financial crisis in East Asia. Its supporters advocated the use of public money to bail it out on the basis that France's international reputation was at stake. As leading insider journalist Étienne Bandy de Nalèche described the BIC defenders' argument: "No French bank has ever failed abroad, and one had to think that the BIC's demise would be a terrible blow to our influence in the Far East." That pro-BIC camp had considerable influence in the French press, and was generally supported by most major newspapers including Le Petit Journal, Le Journal, Le Petit Parisien, L'Œuvre, L'Homme libre, Le Petit Bleu de Paris, and L'Information.

The opposing camp had much less media firepower with Nalèche's Journal des débats and the far-right L'Action francaise. Jean-Noël Jeanneney, the grandson of one of the major figure of the opposing camp, Jules Jeanneney has explained in several publications how the far-right movements "les ligues" which were openly antisemitic had already fought against the Marcelin Berthelot and his son who had supported Alfred Dreyfus. They used the problems with the BIC to imply that Philippe Berthelot could have personally benefited from the bank even though there was no indication of direct corruption by the BIC. In 1921, in the far-right journal "Je suis partout" the Berthelot brothers were even pictured with a big nose and a Jewish kippah.

Briand was put on the defensive and had to concede the resignation of Philippe Berthelot from his Foreign Ministry role on 25 December 1921, before himself resigning in January 1922 following the fiasco of the Cannes Conference on World War I reparations. but the obvious lack of proofs and the outcomes of the Senate investigation resulted in the re-integration of Philippe Berthelot. The respected sinologist Georges Maspero replaced André Berthelot as the bank's president. and Pernotte, the bank's chief executive, was arrested on 23 February 1922, and sentenced to three years of imprisonment.

In early 1922, the French parliament enacted legislation to use France's residual share of the Boxer Indemnity to reimburse the BIC's Chinese claimants; and an agreement to that effect was reached with the Chinese government in April 1925. The BIC's former activity was entrusted in October 1922 to an ad hoc asset management company, the Société française de gérance de la Banque industrielle de Chine, which in 1925 became the Franco-Chinese Bank and the first President who was chosen by the Chinese and the French was André Berthelot. Nevertheless, the former BIC continued to exist as a legal entity, still chaired by Georges Maspero until the late 1930s, even though it was managed by the Franco-Chinese bank headed by André Berthelot; it was eventually wound up in 1950.

== Banknotes ==
Like other foreign banks in China at the time, the Banque Industrielle de Chine issued paper currency in the concessions where it had established branch offices.

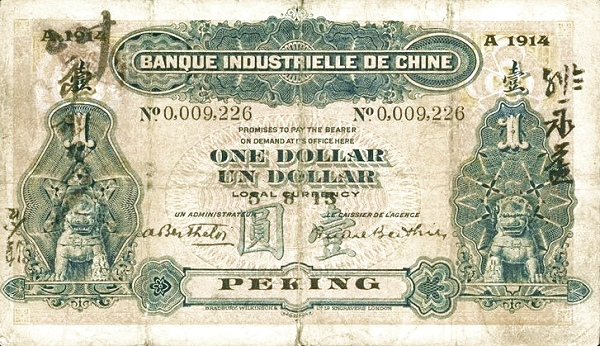
1 dollar local currency, Beijing (1914)

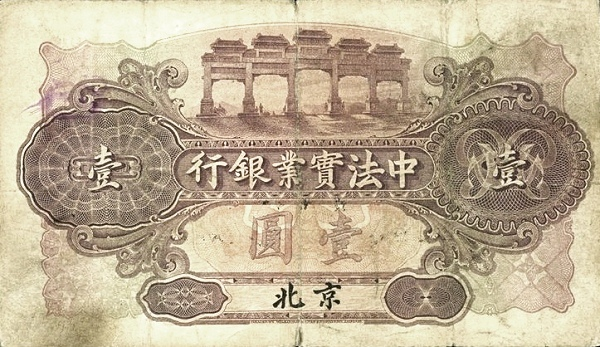
1 dollar local currency, Beijing (1914), reverse

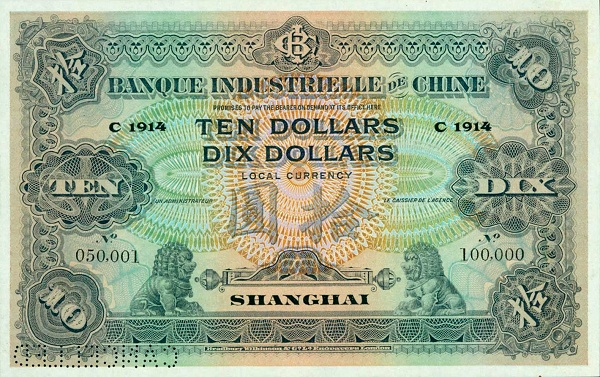
10 dollars local currency, Shanghai (1914)

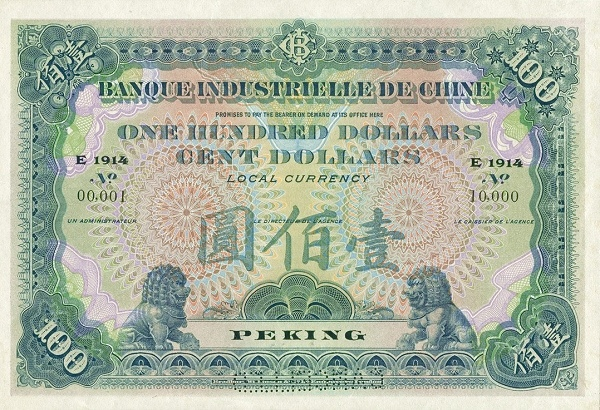
100 dollars local currency, Beijing (1914)

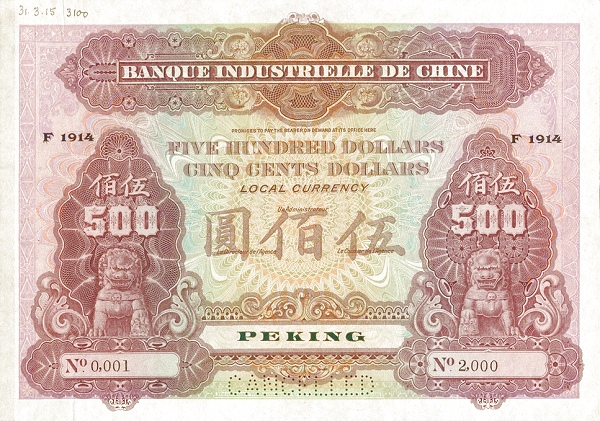
500 dollars local currency, Beijing (1914)

== See also ==
- Deutsch-Asiatische Bank
- Russo-Asiatic Bank
- List of banks in France
