= Germain Henri Hess =

Swiss-Russian chemist and physician (1802–1850)

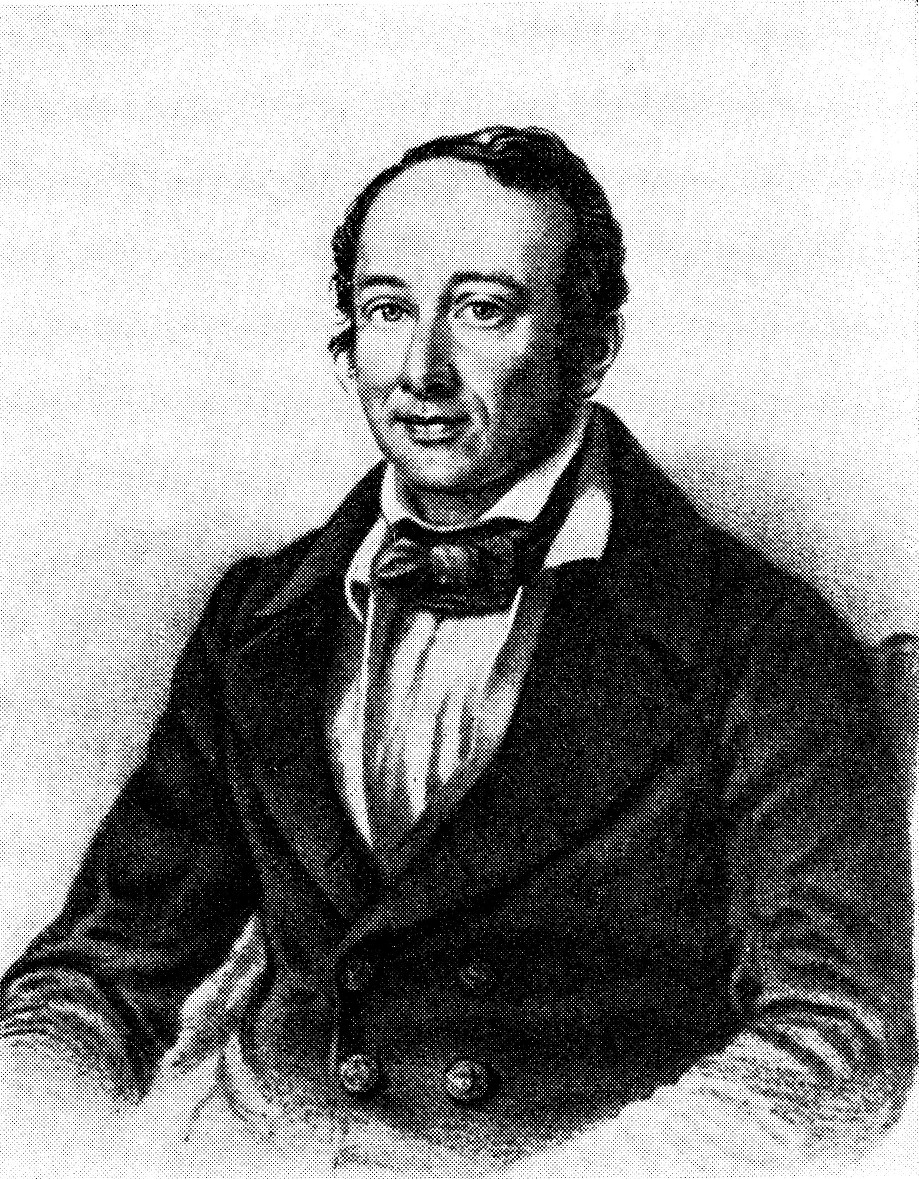
- Portrait, c. 1850
- Born: 7 August 1802; Geneva, France
- Died: 12 December 1850 (aged 48); St. Petersburg, Russia
- Education: University of Dorpat
- Known for: Hess' law, thermochemistry
- Scientific career
- Fields: Chemistry
- Workplaces: St. Petersburg Academy of Sciences

Germain Henri Hess (Russian: Герман Иванович Гесс, romanized: German Ivanovich Gess; 7 August 1802 – 12 December [O.S. 30 November] 1850) was a Swiss-Russian chemist and medical doctor who formulated Hess' law, an early principle of thermochemistry.

== Early life and education ==
Hess was born on 7 August 1802 in Geneva, France (Switzerland after 1815). His father was an artist and in 1805 moved the family to the Russian Empire to work as a tutor to a rich family. His mother was a tutor as well and Hess learned German and French at home. In 1817, his family moved to Dorpat, Russian Empire (now Tartu, Estonia), where he went to a private school for two years, and then to Dorpat Gymnasium, which he finished in 1822. In autumn of the same year Hess studied medicine at the Imperial University of Dorpat. During that time, the chemistry department was responsible for the Chemistry courses of the Medicine and Pharmacy departments and Professor Gottfried W. Osann was giving the lectures in German (an obvious advantage for Hess). Under Osann's supervision, Hess made chemical analyses, but also had an interest in the lectures of Professor of Physics Georges-Frédéric Parrot and Professor of Mineralogy Moritz von Engelhardt. Hess graduated with honors from Dorpat University receiving a doctor of medicine degree with his dissertation entitled Something about Curative Waters, Especially Those in Russia. He qualified as a physician in 1825. By application of Professors Osann and Engelhardt, Hess was sent to Sweden, to visit Swedish chemist Jöns Jakob Berzelius. After this meeting Hess turned once and for all to chemistry. On his return to Russia, Hess joined an expedition to study the geology of the Urals before he was appointed a medical doctor at Irkutsk. According to the regulations of that time, new doctors had to practice at a Russian frontier town after having graduated. Hess went to Irkutsk in August 1826.

== Contributions to chemistry ==
In 1830, Hess took up chemistry full-time, researching and teaching, and later became an adjunct professor of Chemistry at the St. Petersburg Academy of Sciences. His most famous paper, outlining his law on thermochemistry, was published there in 1840. His principle, a progenitor for the first law of thermodynamics, came to be called Hess' law. It states that in a series of chemical reactions, the total energy gained or lost depends only on the initial and final states, regardless of the number or path of the steps. This is also known as the law of constant heat summation.

Like most of his colleagues, Hess was primarily an experimental chemist interested in the discovery and analysis of new substances. However, he also developed a strong interest for theoretical investigations. In particular, he wondered how chemical affinity relates to heat in chemical reactions. His experiments on various hydrates of sulfuric acid showed that the heat released when they formed was always the same, whether the reactions proceeded directly or through intermediates (1840). Hess thus formulated a special case of the conservation of energy two years before Julius Robert von Mayer stated a more general principle, in 1842. Hess was fully aware of the importance of his own contribution.

In 1842, Hess proposed the law of thermoneutrality, which states that no heat is evolved in the exchange reactions of neutral salts in aqueous solution. A full explanation would only be given 45 years later, in terms of electrolytic dissociation, by the Swedish chemist Svante Arrhenius.

After these two major discoveries, Hess was influential in the development of chemistry in Russia. His book Osnovania Chistoy Khimii (Fundamentals of Pure Chemistry) went through seven editions and remained the standard Russian textbook for undergraduate chemistry until 1861. Hess was active as a teacher and mentor of young scientists, until his poor health forced him to retire, in 1848.

== Later research and final days ==
Hess' investigation of minerals included the analysis of silver telluride (Ag_{2}Te), which was named hessite in his honour. He also discovered that the oxidation of sugars yielded saccharic acid.

Hess died prematurely in 1850, at the age of 48, in St. Petersburg. He was buried at Smolenskoe Lutheran cemetery.
