= Thomas Laurent Madeleine Duverne de Presle =

Thomas Laurent Madeleine Duverne de Presle (21 June 1763, possibly at Giverdy 13 December 1844, Maubranches, Cher) was a French sailor.

== Life ==
He was a student at the École militaire de La Flèche in 1777, then served in the French Navy, coming to sympathize with revolutionary ideas during his service in the American Revolutionary War. On the French Revolution he was lieutenant de vaisseau de première classe in 1790, before he and his family fell victim to persecutions of Nivernais nobles. In 1791 he had to emigrate to Switzerland then Germany. Disagreeing with the other émigrés, he returned to France, left again for England, returned on the promulgation of the anti-émigré law on 26 October 1792, though this did not stop him being expelled from Paris on 11 November 1792. This expulsion means he seems to have been in the service of the counter revolutionary struggle.

From 1794 between the count of Provence (future Louis XVIII), François de Charette, the Vendéens and the chouans in Brittany. After the Quiberon landing was defeated in July 1795, he wrote to Louis XVIII to suggest he stop massacring his partisans in uprisings and taking advantage of political and electoral means as a way back to power. At the end of 1795 he made contact with abbot Charles Brottier and Charles Honoré Berthelot La Villeheurnois in a royalist plot. He met with Louis XVIII in Zürich in April 1796 and the comte d'Artois (the future Charles X of France) in London in October, putting them in touch with the progress of the royalist cause. Effectively the elections to the councils of the French Directory led to many elected figures favorable to a restoration of the monarchy, but the plotters were betrayed by a double agent and arrested on 30 June 1797. Condemned to death, Thomas Laurent Duverne de Presle saw this commuted to a 10-year prison sentence. He and the other conspirators were sent to Guyana – Presle was treated leniently, leading some to believe he had told the authorities all he knew about the royalist networks active in France. On 21 March 1798 he embarked on an American ship with a Swiss passport, probably taking him to the USA.

He returned to France and was getting back into contact with the comte d'Artois in London when Napoleon's police arrested him in Paris on 6 October 1803. He protested his devotion to the Imperial regime and was released. Nothing more is known of him until the Bourbon Restoration, when Louis XVIII made him retire at the rank of capitaine de frégate.
