= Bordwell thermodynamic cycle =

Scientific process

A Bordwell thermodynamic cycle use experimentally determined and reasonable estimates of Gibbs free energy (ΔG˚) values to determine unknown and experimentally inaccessible values.

== Overview ==
Analogous to Hess's law which deal with the summation of enthalpy (ΔH) values, Bordwell thermodynamic cycles deal with the summation of Gibbs free energy (ΔG) values. Free energies used in these systems are most often determined from equilibriums and redox potentials, both of which correlate with free energy. This is with the caveat that redox scales are not absolute and thus it is important that all electrons are evaluated in redox pairs. This removes the offset of a given reference potential, otherwise the values are reported as potentials (V) against that reference. It is also worth recognizing that the values of the pK_{a} system are just moderately transformed K_{eq} values.

When working with equilibrium energy values such as ΔG˚ and E˚_{1/2} values it common to employ a naught (˚) symbol. The naught has a two-component definition. The first more common component is that it refers to the physical conditions being at standard state. The second more significant component is that energy refers to an equilibrium energy even if there is a conditionally defined standard state. Just as activation energy with the double dagger ΔG^{‡} refers the energy difference between reactants and the transition state, ΔG˚ refers to the energy difference between reactants and products. The nought is assumed when working with equilibrium values such as K_{eq} and pK_{a}.

The example below contains four reactions that can be related through their associated free energies. [ An example of the former is the dissolution of ammonium nitrate. This process is spontaneous even though it is endothermic. It occurs because the favored increase in disorder that accompanies dissolution outweighs the unfavored increase in energy.] Given any three values and the fourth can be calculated. Its important to note that the fourth reaction in the series is an inverted homolytic bond cleavage stated in terms of free energy. The chemical transformation for the associated -ΔG˚ is the same it would be for a bond dissociation energy (BDE). However, the -ΔG˚ is not a BDE, since BDE are by definition stated in terms of enthalpy (ΔH˚). The two values are of course related by ΔG˚ = ΔH˚ - TΔS˚ and as a result educated comparisons can be made between ΔG˚ and ΔH˚.

R- ⇌ e- + R^{.} (Reaction 1)

ΔG^{o}_{rxn 1} = -nFE˚_{1/2}

H^{+} + e- ⇌ H^{.} (Reaction 2)

ΔG^{o}_{rxn 2} = -nFE˚_{1/2}

RH ⇌ H^{+} + R- (Reaction 3)

ΔG^{o}_{rxn 3} = RT(2.303)pK_{a}

R^{.} + H^{.} ⇌ RH (Reaction 4)

ΔG^{o}_{rxn 4} = -RTln(K_{eq})

== Conversions ==
Relationships between K_{eq}, pK_{eq}, E˚_{1/2}, and ΔG˚.

ΔG˚ = -RTln(K_{eq})

ΔG˚ = (2.303)RT(pK_{eq})

ΔG˚ = -nFE˚_{1/2}

Useful conversion factors:

-23.06 (kcal/mol)(e^{−})^{−1}(V)^{−1}

1.37(pK_{eq}) kcal/mol

1.37[-log(K_{eq})] kcal/mol
