= Jean-Michel Berthelot =

French sociologist and philosopher

- Born: 7 June 1945; Jonzac, France
- Died: February 5, 2006 (aged 60); Toulouse, France

Education
- Education: École Normale Supérieure

Philosophical work
- Era: 20th-century philosophy
- Region: Western philosophy
- School: Continental philosophy French historical epistemology
- Institutions: University of Toulouse II; École des Hautes Études en Sciences Sociales
- Main interests: Philosophy, sociology, education, historical epistemology, philosophy of social sciences, social theory
- Notable ideas: Typology of sociological explanations

Jean-Michel Berthelot (French: [ʒɑ̃ miʃɛl bɛʁtəlo]; 7 June 1945 – 5 February 2006) was a French sociologist, philosopher, epistemologist and social theorist, specialist in philosophy of social sciences, history of sociology, sociology of education, sociology of knowledge, sociology of science and sociology of the body.

== Career ==
Former student of the École Normale Supérieure, Jean Michel Berthelot began his career as a teacher of philosophy in secondary education. After a PhD under the direction of Raymond Ledrut, he became professor of sociology at the University of Toulouse Jean Jaures from 1982 to 1997, where he directed the CERS (Centre d'études et de recherches sociologiques) and the doctoral school. In 1997, he joined the University of Paris Sorbonne, first Paris V and then Paris IV. He was Secretary General of the International Association of French speaking sociologists Language (AISLF), from 1992 to 2000, as well as Secretary General of the journal "Les Cahiers Internationaux de Sociologie".

== Epistemology and history of sociology ==
Berthelot's philosophy and history of social sciences was influenced by Kant, French historical epistemology of Bachelard, Canguilhem, Koyré and Gaston Granger, the falsifiability of Popper and Lakatos and the epistemological reflections of sociologists, from Durkheim, Weber and Simmel to Passeron, Adorno and Habermas.

Jean-Michel Berthelot's epistemological work combined the philosophy and history of science in the study of sociological theories to understand the logic of construction and justification of sociological knowledge. Berthelot created a typology of sociological explanations, constituted by six logical schemas of intelligibility: causal, actancial, hermeneutic, structural, functionalist and dialectic. These types of explanation were the result of formalization of theory and arguments in the history of sociology.

Berthelot, at the same time, criticized the epistemic relativism and defended the pluralism and openness in sociology, which makes him, in the contemporary debate on philosophy of social sciences, a rationalist and constructivist. The pluralism in sociology, in Berthelot's epistemology, is not only inevitably, but even fruitful for the research and theoretical debate.

== Works ==
- 1983 Berthelot J.-M., Le piège scolaire, Paris, PUF, 304 pages.
- 1988 Berthelot J.-M. ed., E. Durkheim, Les règles de la méthode sociologique, nouvelle édition critique avec notice biographique, index, variantes, précédée d'une étude originale, Les règles de la méthode sociologique ou l'instauration du raisonnement expérimental en sociologie, 60 p. Paris, Flammarion, coll. Champs.
- 1991 Berthelot J.-M., La construction de la sociologie, Paris, PUF, collection Que-sais-je, 128 p., n° 2602. (5ème éd. 2001).
- 1995 Berthelot J.-M., Durkheim, l'avénement de la sociologie, Toulouse, PUM, 186 p.
- 1996 Berthelot J.-M., Les vertus de l'incertitude. Le travail de l'analyse dans les sciences sociales, Paris, PUF, 271 p. Réedition "Quadrige-Essais Débats", 2004
- 2000 Berthelot J.-M., Sociologie. Epistémologie d’une discipline. Textes fondamentaux, Bruxelles, De Boeck, 479 p.
- 2000 Berthelot J.-M., La sociologie française contemporaine (sous la direction de), Paris, PUF, 2000, 274 p. Réédition Quadrige, 2001, 2003.
- 2001 Berthelot J.-M., Epistémologie des sciences sociales (sous la direction de.), Paris, PUF, coll. 1er cycle, 600 p.
- 2003 Berthelot J.-M., Figures du texte scientifique (sous la direction de), Paris, PUF.
- 2005 Berthelot J.-M., Martin O., Collinet C., Savoirs et savants. Les études sur la science en France, Paris, PUF.
- 2008 Berthelot J.-M., L'emprise du vrai. Connaissance scientifique et modernité, Paris, PUF, (posthumous edition).
