= Hess's law =

Thermodynamic law in chemistry

A representation of Hess's law (where H represents enthalpy)

In physical chemistry and thermodynamics, Hess's law of constant heat summation, also known simply as Hess's law, is a scientific law named after Germain Hess, a Swiss-born Russian chemist and physician who published it in 1840. The law states that the total enthalpy change during the complete course of a chemical reaction is independent of the sequence of steps taken.

Hess's law is now understood as an expression of the fact that the enthalpy of a chemical process is independent of the path taken from the initial to the final state (i.e. enthalpy is a state function). According to the first law of thermodynamics, the enthalpy change in a system due to a reaction at constant pressure is equal to the heat absorbed (or the negative of the heat released), which can be determined by calorimetry for many reactions. The values are usually stated for reactions with the same initial and final temperatures and pressures (while conditions are allowed to vary during the course of the reactions). Hess's law can be used to determine the overall energy required for a chemical reaction that can be divided into synthetic steps that are individually easier to characterize. This affords the compilation of standard enthalpies of formation, which may be used to predict the enthalpy change in complex synthesis.

== Theory ==
Hess's law states that the change of enthalpy in a chemical reaction is the same regardless of whether the reaction takes place in one step or several steps, provided the initial and final states of the reactants and products are the same. Enthalpy is an extensive property, meaning that its value is proportional to the system size. Because of this, the enthalpy change is proportional to the number of moles participating in a given reaction.

In other words, if a chemical change takes place by several different routes, the overall enthalpy change is the same, regardless of the route by which the chemical change occurs (provided the initial and final condition are the same). If this were not true, then one could violate the first law of thermodynamics.

Hess's law allows the enthalpy change (ΔH) for a reaction to be calculated even when it cannot be measured directly. This is accomplished by performing basic algebraic operations based on the chemical equations of reactions using previously determined values for the enthalpies of formation.

Combination of chemical equations leads to a net or overall equation. If the enthalpy changes are known for all the equations in the sequence, their sum will be the enthalpy change for the net equation. If the net enthalpy change is negative ($\Delta H_\text{net}<0$), the reaction is exothermic and is more likely to be spontaneous; positive ΔH values correspond to endothermic reactions. (Entropy also plays an important role in determining spontaneity, as some reactions with a positive enthalpy change are nevertheless spontaneous due to an entropy increase in the reaction system.)

== Use of enthalpies of formation ==
Hess's law states that enthalpy changes are additive. Thus the value of the standard enthalpy of reaction can be calculated from standard enthalpies of formation of products and reactants as follows:

$$\Delta H_{\text{reaction}}^\text{⦵} =\sum_{i} a_i\Delta_{\text{f}} H_{\text{products}}^{\text{⦵}} - \sum_{i} b_i\Delta_{\text{f}} H_{\text{reactants}}^{\text{⦵}}$$

Here, the first sum is over all products and the second over all reactants, $a_i$ and $b_i$ are the stoichiometric coefficients of products and reactants respectively, $\Delta_{\text{f}} H_{\text{products}}^{\text{⦵}}$ and$\Delta_{\text{f}} H_{\text{reactants}}^{\text{⦵}}$ are the standard enthalpies of formation of products and reactants respectively, and the ^{~~o~~} superscript indicates standard state values. This may be considered as the sum of two (real or fictitious) reactions:

Reactants → Elements (in their standard states)
$$\Delta H_{\text{RE}}^{\text{⦵}} = -\sum_{i} b_i\Delta_{\text{f}} H_{\text{reactants}}^{\text{⦵}}$$

and Elements → Products

$$\Delta H_{\text{EP}}^{\text{⦵}} = \sum_{i} a_i\Delta_{\text{f}} H_{\text{products}}^{\text{⦵}}$$

== Examples ==
1. Given:
  1. C_{graphite} + O_{2} → CO_{2}(g) (ΔH = −393.5 kJ/mol) (direct step)
  2. C_{graphite} + 1/2 O_{2} → CO(g) (ΔH = −110.5 kJ/mol)
  3. CO(g) +1/2 O_{2} → CO_{2}(g) (ΔH = −283.0 kJ/mol)
  Reaction (a) is the sum of reactions (b) and (c), for which the total ΔH = −393.5 kJ/mol, which is equal to ΔH in (a).
2. Given:
  - B_{2}O_{3}(s) + 3H_{2}O(g) → 3O_{2}(g) + B_{2}H_{6}(g) (ΔH = 2035 kJ/mol)
  - H_{2}O(l) → H_{2}O(g) (ΔH = 44 kJ/mol)
  - H_{2}(g) + 1/2 O_{2}(g) → H_{2}O(l) (ΔH = −286 kJ/mol)
  - 2B(s) + 3H_{2}(g) → B_{2}H_{6}(g) (ΔH = 36 kJ/mol)
  Find the Δ_{f}H of:
  - 2B(s) + 3/2 O_{2}(g) → B_{2}O_{3}(s)
  After multiplying the equations (and their enthalpy changes) by appropriate factors and reversing the direction when necessary, the result is:
  - B_{2}H_{6}(g) + 3O_{2}(g) → B_{2}O_{3}(s) + 3H_{2}O(g) (ΔH = 2035 × (−1) = −2035 kJ/mol)
  - 3H_{2}O(g) → 3H_{2}O(l) (ΔH = 44 × (−3) = −132 kJ/mol)
  - 3H_{2}O(l) → 3H_{2}(g) + (3/2) O_{2}(g) (ΔH = −286 × (−3) = 858 kJ/mol)
  - 2B(s) + 3H_{2}(g) → B_{2}H_{6}(g) (ΔH = 36 kJ/mol)
  Adding these equations and cancelling out the common terms on both sides, we obtain
  - 2B(s) + 3/2 O_{2}(g) → B_{2}O_{3}(s) (ΔH = −1273 kJ/mol)

== Extension to free energy and entropy ==
The concepts of Hess's law can be expanded to include changes in entropy and in Gibbs free energy, since these are also state functions. The Bordwell thermodynamic cycle is an example of such an extension that takes advantage of easily measured equilibria and redox potentials to determine experimentally inaccessible Gibbs free energy values. Combining ΔG^{~~o~~} values from Bordwell thermodynamic cycles and ΔH^{~~o~~} values found with Hess's law can be helpful in determining entropy values that have not been measured directly and therefore need to be calculated through alternative paths.

For the free energy:

$$\Delta G_{\text{reaction}}^\text{⦵} = \sum \nu_{\text{p}} \Delta G_{\mathrm f \,(\text{p})}^{\text{⦵}} - \sum \nu_{\text{r}} \Delta G_{\mathrm f \,(\text{r})}^{\text{⦵}}.$$

For entropy, the situation is a little different. Because entropy can be measured as an absolute value, not relative to those of the elements in their reference states (as with ΔH^{~~o~~} and ΔG^{~~o~~}), there is no need to use the entropy of formation; one simply uses the absolute entropies for products and reactants:

$$\Delta S_{\text{reaction}}^\text{⦵} = \sum \nu_{\text{p}} S_{(\text{p})}^{\text{⦵}} - \sum \nu_{\text{r}} S_{(\text{r})}^{\text{⦵}}.$$

== Applications ==
Hess's law is useful in the determination of enthalpies of the following:

1. Heats of formation of unstable intermediates like CO_{(g)} and NO_{(g)}.
2. Heat changes in phase transitions and allotropic transitions.
3. Lattice energies of ionic substances by constructing Born–Haber cycles if the electron affinity to form the anion is known, or
4. Electron affinities using a Born–Haber cycle with a theoretical lattice energy.

== See also ==
- Thermochemistry
- Thermodynamics
