= Charles Honoré Berthelot La Villeheurnois =

French politician

Charles Honoré Berthelot La Villeheurnois (French: [ʃaʁl ɔnɔʁe bɛʁtəlo la vilœʁnwa]; c. 1750, Toulon - 10 July 1799, Sinnamary, Guyana) was a French politician.

He was maître des requêtes to Louis XVI and with Charles Brottier and Thomas Laurent Madeleine Duverne de Presle was one of the heads of the plot called the "camp de Grenelle". Thinking they could count on generals Malo and Jean-Pierre Ramel, who had crushed the Conspiracy of Equals, they envisaged taking the troops under their orders (stationed at Grenelle camp), leading them against the Directors and re-establishing the monarchy. In fact the two generals warned the Directory of the conspirators' approaches and all three conspirators were arrested before they could do anything. Condemned to only a year in prison, Charles Honoré de La Villeheurnois was deported after the coup d'état of 18 Fructidor (4 September 1797), and died in Guyana.
