= Berthelot's reagent =

Alkaline solution

- Classification: Colorimetric method
- Analytes: Ammonia

Berthelot's reagent (English: /bɛərtəˈloʊ/ ber-tə-LOH, French: [bɛʁtəlo]) is an alkaline solution of phenol and hypochlorite, used in analytical chemistry. It is named after its inventor, Marcellin Berthelot. Ammonia reacts with Berthelot's reagent to form a blue product which is used in a colorimetric method for determining ammonia. The reagent can also be used for determining urea. In this case the enzyme urease is used to catalyze the hydrolysis of urea into carbon dioxide and ammonia. The ammonia is then determined with Berthelot's reagent.

== Variations ==
Phenol in the Berthelot reagent can be replaced by a variety of phenolic reagents, the most common being sodium salicylate, which is significantly less toxic. This has been used for blood urea nitrogen (BUN) determinations and commonly is used to determine water and soil total and ammonia-N. Replacement of phenol by 2-phenylphenol reduces interferences by a variety of soil and water constituents and improves color stability at slightly lower pH.

== Uses ==
Berthelot's reagent has been used in a range of situations. It is often used in colorimetric methods, through an AutoAnalyzer, spectrophotometer, or multiwell plate spectrophotometer. The reagent lacks sensitivity in situations where there may be amines as well as ammonia, however this can be overcome in part by the use of 2-phenylphenol to replace phenol. An ion selective electrode, or distillation/titration method can often be used in cases where Berthelot chemistry is ineffective.

Berthelot chemistry has also been adapted for the analysis of nitrite and nitrate in soil and water after conversion, typically by reduction with Devarda's alloy, of these species to ammonium.
