= Sophie Berthelot =

French woman interred at the Panthéon

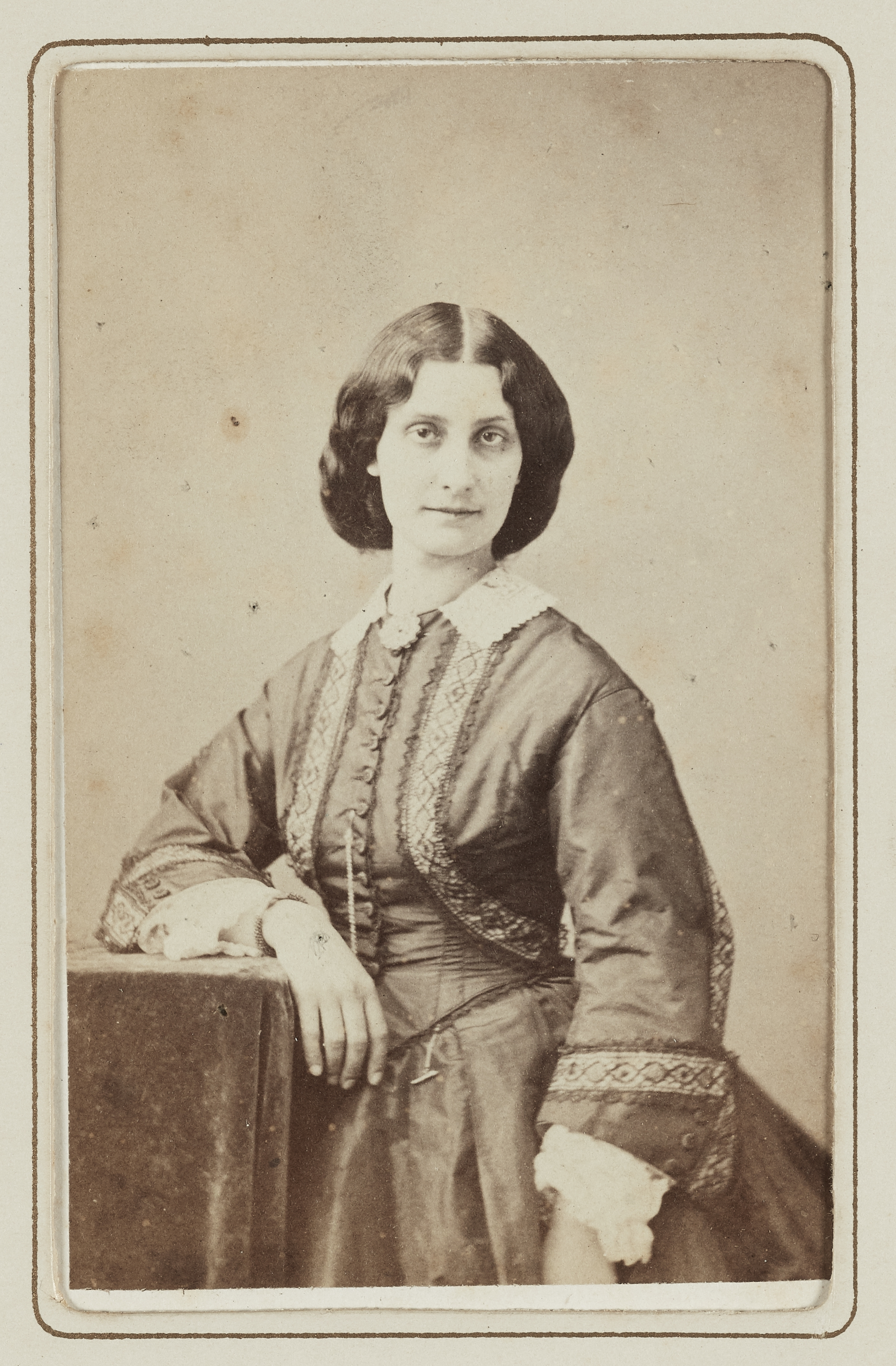
- Born: Sophie Caroline Niaudet; February 17, 1837; Nantes, France
- Died: March 18, 1907 (aged 70); Paris, France
- Resting place: Panthéon
- Known for: First woman interred at the Panthéon
- Spouse: Marcellin Berthelot (m. 1861–1907)
- Children: André Berthelot; Philippe Berthelot
- Relatives: Louis-François-Clement Breguet (uncle)

Sophie Caroline Berthelot, née Niaudet (English: /bɛərtəˈloʊ/ ber-tə-LOH, French: [sɔfi kaʁɔlin bɛʁtəlo]; February 17, 1837 – March 18, 1907), became the first woman to be interred in the Panthéon, alongside her husband Marcellin Berthelot. She was the only woman interred in the Panthéon until Marie Curie almost a century later in 1995.

== Biography ==
Berthelot was born on February 17, 1837, in Nantes. She was the niece of Louis-François-Clement Breguet and received a strict Calvinist education from her mother in the tradition of the Breguet family. She married the chemist and politician Marcellin Berthelot on May 10, 1861. Her husband "lived in complete and happy union with his wife." The couple had four sons and two daughters, including the politician and historian André Berthelot (1862–1938), the scholar Daniel Berthelot (1865–1927), the diplomat Philippe Berthelot (1866–1934) and the philosopher René Berthelot (1872–1960).

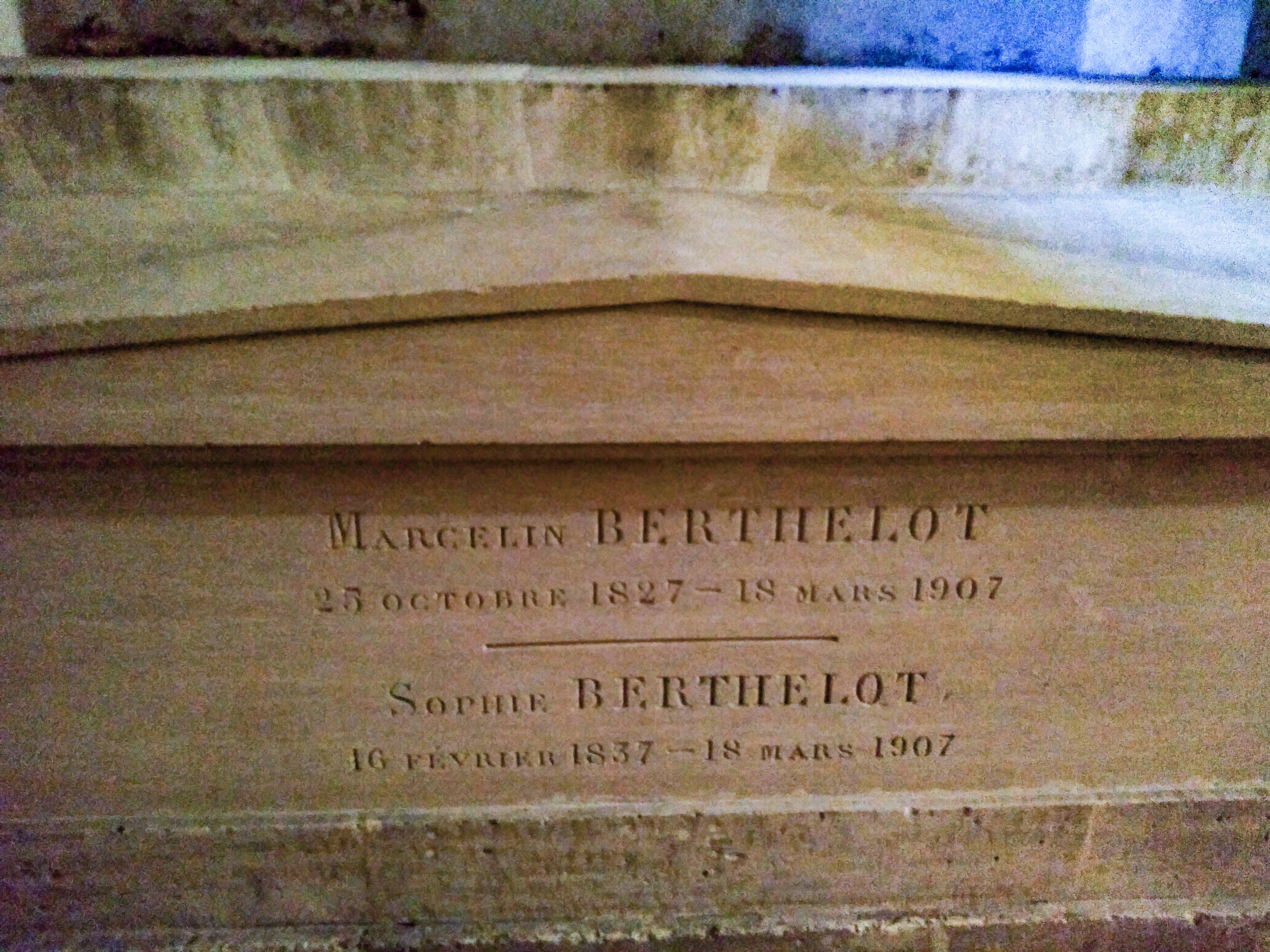
Tomb of Marcellin and Sophie Berthelot in the Panthéon

Sophie Berthelot died of heart disease in Paris on March 18, 1907, mere hours before her husband's death. Acceding to the family's wishes and "in homage to her conjugal virtue," the French government passed a special law to permit Sophie Berthelot to be interred alongside her famous husband in the Panthéon. They had a joint state funeral and were buried in the same tomb. A school in Calais is named in her honor.
