= André Berthelot =

French politician (1862–1938)

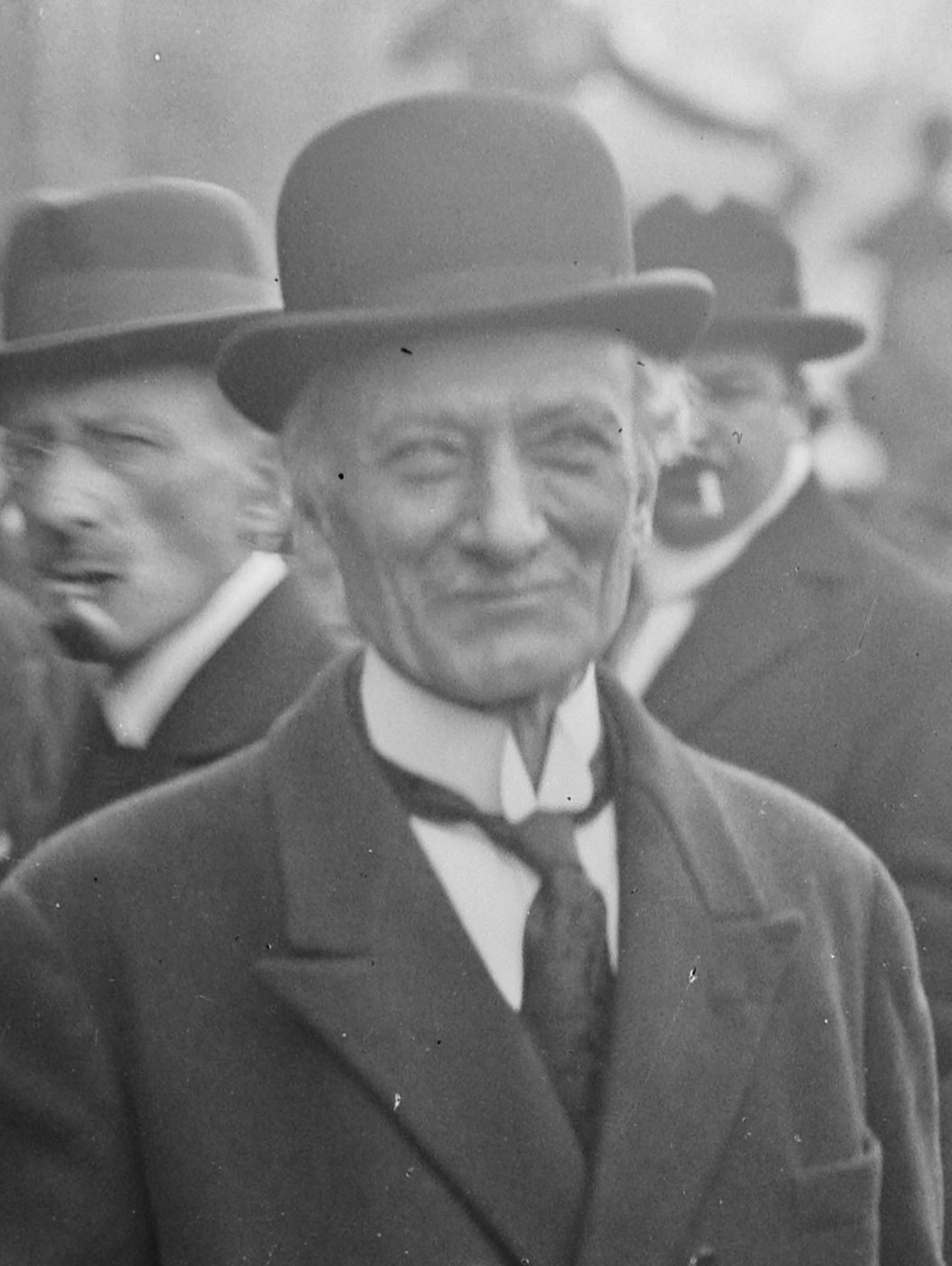
André Berthelot

André Marcel Berthelot (English: /bɛərtəˈloʊ/ ber-tə-LOH, French: [ɑ̃dʁe maʁsɛl bɛʁtəlo]; 20 May 1862 – 6 June 1938) was the son of the chemist and politician Marcellin Berthelot and Sophie Berthelot and a député of the Seine.

He was secretary-general of the Grande Encyclopédie starting with the fourth volume. He was also a banker, a professor in ancient history, a vice-president of the École des hautes études, and a member of the École de Rome. He was the founding chairman of the Banque Industrielle de Chine and led its board until the bank's failure in 1921.
