= Thermochemistry =

Branch of thermodynamics

Thermochemistry is the study of the heat energy which is associated with chemical reactions and/or phase changes such as melting and boiling. A reaction may release or absorb energy, and a phase change may do the same. Thermochemistry focuses on the energy exchange between a system and its surroundings in the form of heat. Thermochemistry is useful in predicting reactant and product quantities throughout the course of a given reaction. In combination with entropy determinations, it is also used to predict whether a reaction is spontaneous or non-spontaneous, favorable or unfavorable.

Endothermic reactions absorb heat, while exothermic reactions release heat. Thermochemistry coalesces the concepts of thermodynamics with the concept of energy in the form of chemical bonds. The subject commonly includes calculations of such quantities as heat capacity, heat of combustion, heat of formation, enthalpy, entropy, and free energy.

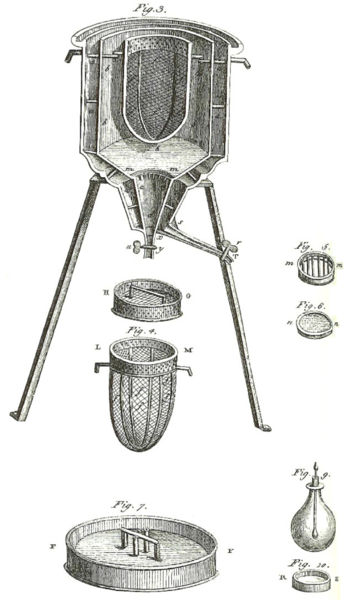
The world's first ice-calorimeter, used in the winter of 1782–83, by Antoine Lavoisier and Pierre-Simon Laplace, to determine the heat evolved in various chemical changes; calculations which were based on Joseph Black's prior discovery of latent heat. These experiments mark the foundation of thermochemistry.

Thermochemistry is one part of the broader field of chemical thermodynamics, which deals with the exchange of all forms of energy between system and surroundings, including not only heat but also various forms of work, as well the exchange of matter. When all forms of energy are considered, the concepts of exothermic and endothermic reactions are generalized to exergonic reactions and endergonic reactions.

== History ==
Thermochemistry rests on two generalizations. Stated in modern terms, they are as follows:

1. Lavoisier and Laplace's law (1780): The energy change accompanying any transformation is equal and opposite to energy change accompanying the reverse process.
2. Hess' law of constant heat summation (1840): The energy change accompanying any transformation is the same whether the process occurs in one step or many.

These statements preceded the first law of thermodynamics (1845) and helped in its formulation.

Thermochemistry also involves the measurement of the latent heat of phase transitions. Joseph Black had already introduced the concept of latent heat in 1761, based on the observation that heating ice at its melting point did not raise the temperature but instead caused some ice to melt.

Gustav Kirchhoff showed in 1858 that the variation of the heat of reaction is given by the difference in heat capacity between products and reactants: dΔH / dT = ΔC_{p}. Integration of this equation permits the evaluation of the heat of reaction at one temperature from measurements at another temperature.

== Calorimetry ==
The measurement of heat changes is performed using calorimetry, usually an enclosed chamber within which the change to be examined occurs. The temperature of the chamber is monitored either using a thermometer or thermocouple, and the temperature plotted against time to give a graph from which fundamental quantities can be calculated. Modern calorimeters are frequently supplied with automatic devices to provide a quick read-out of information, one example being the differential scanning calorimeter.

== Systems ==
Several thermodynamic definitions are very useful in thermochemistry. A system is the specific portion of the universe that is being studied. Everything outside the system is considered the surroundings or environment. A system may be:

- a (completely) isolated system which can exchange neither energy nor matter with the surroundings, such as an insulated bomb calorimeter
- a thermally isolated system which can exchange mechanical work but not heat or matter, such as an insulated closed piston or balloon
- a mechanically isolated system which can exchange heat but not mechanical work or matter, such as an uninsulated bomb calorimeter
- a closed system which can exchange energy but not matter, such as an uninsulated closed piston or balloon
- an open system which can exchange both matter and energy with the surroundings, such as a pot of boiling water

== Processes ==
A system undergoes a process when one or more of its properties changes. A process relates to the change of state. An isothermal (same-temperature) process occurs when temperature of the system remains constant. An isobaric (same-pressure) process occurs when the pressure of the system remains constant. A process is adiabatic when no heat exchange occurs.

== See also ==
- Calorimetry
- Chemical kinetics
- Cryochemistry
- Differential scanning calorimetry
- Isodesmic reaction
- Important publications in thermochemistry
- Photoelectron photoion coincidence spectroscopy
- Principle of maximum work
- Reaction Calorimeter
- Thermodynamic databases for pure substances
- Thermodynamics
- Thomsen-Berthelot principle
- Julius Thomsen
