= Philippe Berthelot =

French diplomat (1866–1934)

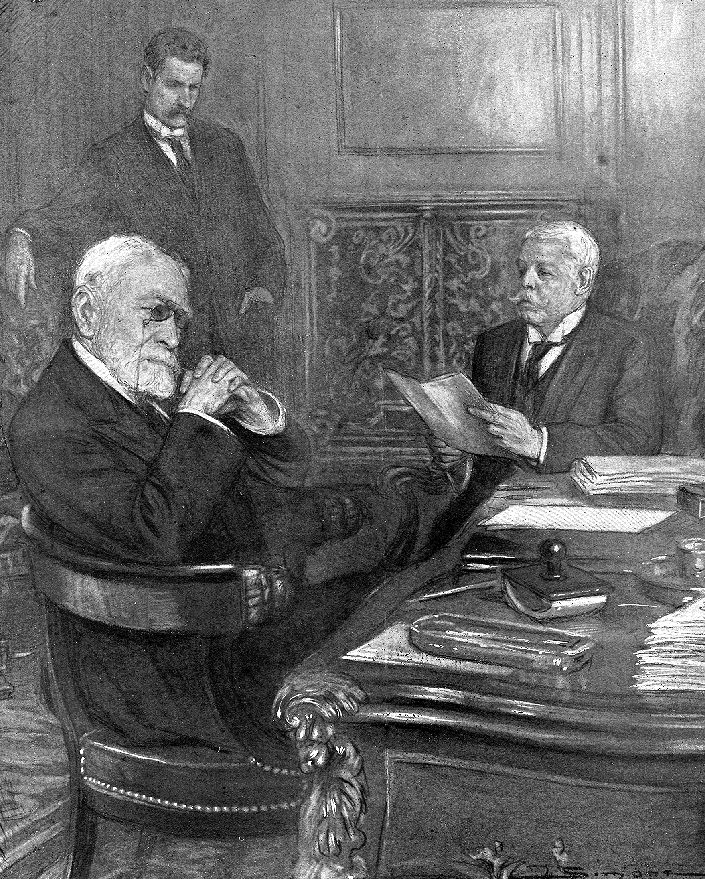
Jean-Baptiste Bienvenu-Martin, Philippe Berthelot and Wilhelm von Schoen. Baron von Schoen reads to M. Bienvenu-Martin, who is assuring interim for Foreign Affairs, a communication from his government backing Austria and declaring that if the conflict does not remain localised, "the most serious consequences" are to be feared.

Philippe Berthelot (English: /bɛərtəˈloʊ/ ber-tə-LOH, French: [filip bɛʁtəlo]; 9 October 1866 – 22 November 1934) was an important French diplomat, son of Marcellin Berthelot and Sophie Berthelot. He was a republican (as opposed to monarchists and the far-right leagues at the time).

Born in Sèvres, Hauts-de-Seine, in his later life he entered the French diplomatic service in 1889 and joined the foreign office in 1904.

In a letter to his wife from the front of World War I, Henri Barbusse wrote on 30 May 1915: "Yesterday, journalists came to our trench, accompanied by Philippe Berthelot, a senior Foreign Ministry official. He talked to me without recognizing me. Soldiers here regard this king of trench tourists with irony, one can say - with contempt".

He managed with Edvard Beneš in Paris and Tomáš Garrigue Masaryk in Washington a transformation of the Czechoslovak National Council on Czechoslovak Government from September to October 1918. In 1920, he became secretary to the Ministry of Foreign Affairs, with the rank of ambassador.

After a violent campaign of far-right leagues, he was forced to step aside from 1922 to 1925 because of his involvement in the scandal opposing the Banque Industrielle de Chine, controlled by his brother, and the Banque d'Indochine, linked to Paul Doumer, who was supported by the extreme right. After an investigation, he and his brother were cleared.

He was friends with and helped the diplomatic careers of Paul Claudel and Saint-John Perse. He died in Paris in 1934.

== Sources ==
- Encyclopædia Britannica, 13th edition, 1922, s.v. Philippe Berthelot.
- The Living Age, 8th Series, Volume XXVII (July, August, September 1922), Boston, p 500. Available at Google Books
- The Diplomats 1919-1939, Edited by Gordon A. Craig and Felix Gilbert, chapter 2, The French Foreign Office: The Era of Philippe Berthelot pp.49-85. By Richard D. Challener.
