= Marcellin Berthelot =

French chemist and politician (1827–1907)

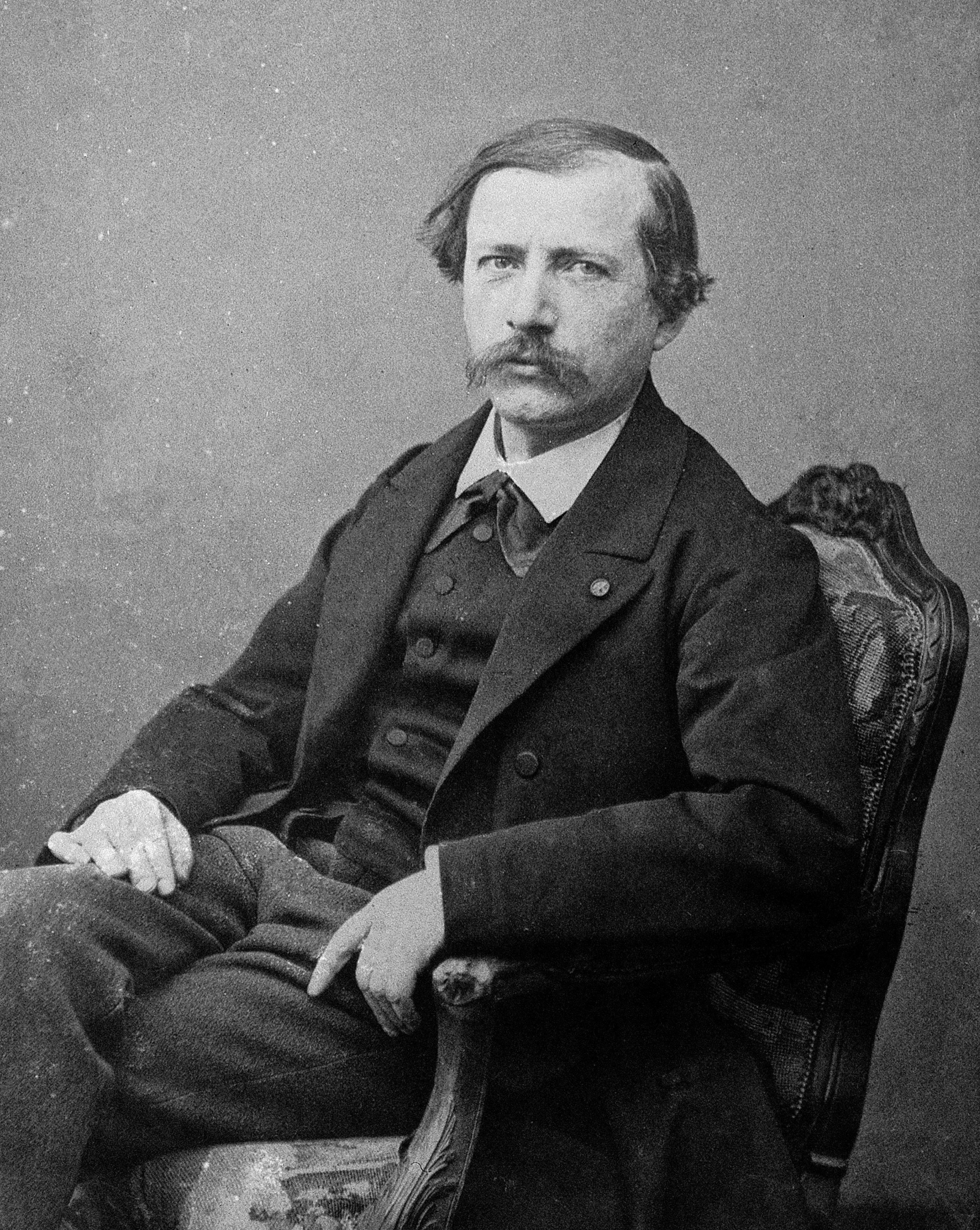
- Born: Pierre Eugène Marcellin Berthelot; 25 October 1827; Paris, France
- Died: 18 March 1907 (aged 79); Paris, France
- Known for: Thomsen–Berthelot principle Berthelot's reagent Principle of maximum work
- Spouse: Sophie Berthelot
- Children: André; Marie-Hélène; Camille; Daniel; Philippe; René
- Awards: Davy Medal (1883); Copley Medal (1900)
- Scientific career
- Fields: Chemistry (thermochemistry)
- Thesis: Mémoire sur les combinaisons de la glycérine avec les acides et sur la synthèse des principes immédiats des graisses des animaux (1854)

Pierre Eugène Marcellin Berthelot (English: /bɛərtəˈloʊ/ ber-tə-LOH, French: [pjɛʁ øʒɛn maʁsəlɛ̃ bɛʁtəlo]; 25 October 1827 – 18 March 1907) was a French chemist and Republican politician noted for the Thomsen–Berthelot principle of thermochemistry. He synthesized many organic compounds from inorganic substances, providing a large amount of counter-evidence to the theory of Jöns Jakob Berzelius that organic compounds required organisms in their synthesis. Berthelot was convinced that chemical synthesis would revolutionize the food industry by the year 2000, and that synthesized foods would replace farms and pastures. "Why not", he asked, "if it proved cheaper and better to make the same materials than to grow them?"

He was considered "one of the most famous chemists in the world." Upon being appointed to the post of Minister of Foreign Affairs for the French government in 1895, he was considered "the most eminent living chemist" in France. In 1901, he was elected as one of the "Forty Immortals" of the Académie Française. He gave all his discoveries not only to the French government but to humanity.

== Personal life ==
Berthelot was born in Rue du Mouton, Paris, France, on 25 October 1827, the son of a doctor. He decided with his friend, the great historian Ernest Renan, not to attend a grande école where the vast majority of intellectuals were being educated. After doing well at school in history and philosophy, he became a scientist.

He was an atheist but was very influenced by his wife, who was a Calvinist (his wife came from Louis Breguet's family).

== Discoveries ==
The fundamental conception that underlay all Berthelot's chemical work was that all chemical phenomena depend on the action of physical forces which can be determined and measured. When he began his active career it was generally believed that, although some instances of the synthetic production of organic substances had been observed, on the whole organic chemistry remained an analytical science and could not become a constructive one, because the formation of the substances with which it deals required the intervention of vital activity in some shape. He engaged in a long argument with Louis Pasteur on the subject of vitalism, in which Pasteur took the vitalist position on the basis of his work on alcoholic fermentation.

To this attitude he offered uncompromising opposition, and by the synthetic production of numerous hydrocarbons, natural fats, sugars and other bodies he proved that organic compounds can be formed by ordinary methods of chemical manipulation and obey the same principles as inorganic substances, thus exhibiting the "creative character in virtue of which chemistry actually realizes the abstract conceptions of its theories and classifications—a prerogative so far possessed neither by the natural nor by the historical sciences."

== Publications ==
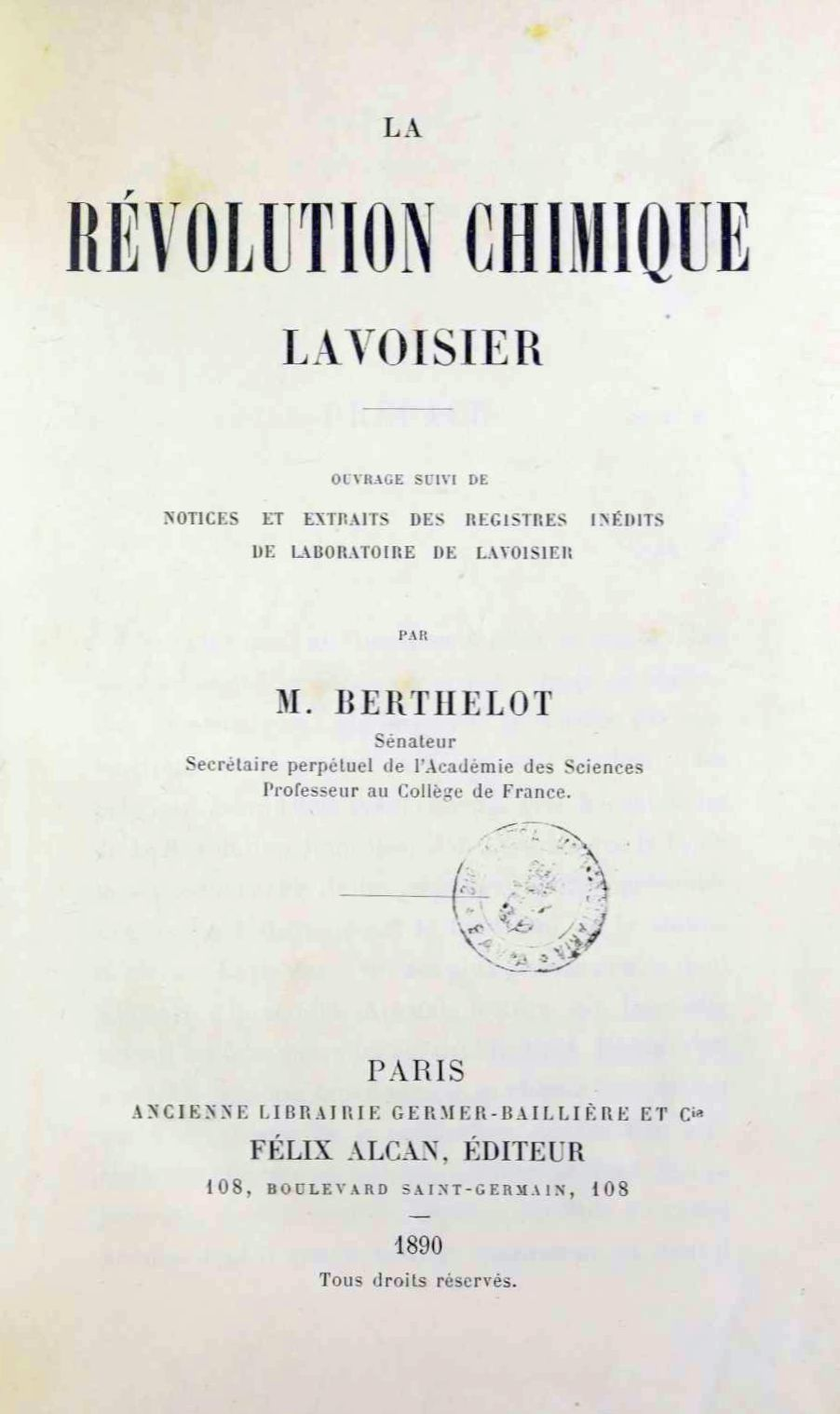
La Révolution chimique, 1890

His investigations on the synthesis of organic compounds were published in numerous papers and books, including Chimie organique fondée sur la synthèse (1860) and Les Carbures d'hydrogène (1901). He stated that chemical phenomena are not governed by any peculiar laws special to themselves, but are explicable in terms of the general laws of mechanics that are in operation throughout the universe; and this view he developed, with the aid of thousands of experiments, in his Mécanique chimique (1878) and his Thermochimie (1897). This branch of study naturally conducted him to the investigation of explosives, and on the theoretical side led to the results published in his work Sur la force de la poudre et des matières explosives (1872), while in practical terms it enabled him to render important services to his country as president of the scientific defence committee during the siege of Paris (1870–1871) and subsequently as chief of the French explosives committee. He performed experiments to determine gas pressures during hydrogen explosions using a special chamber fitted with a piston, and was able to distinguish burning of mixtures of hydrogen and oxygen from true explosions.

=== Historical and philosophical work ===
During later life he researched and wrote books on the early history of chemistry such as Les Origines de l'alchimie (1885) and Introduction à l'étude de la chimie des anciens et du moyen âge (1889), He also translated various old Greek, Syriac and Arabic treatises on alchemy and chemistry: Collection des anciens alchimistes grecs (1887–1888) and La Chimie au moyen âge (1893). He was the author of Science et philosophie (1886), which contains a well-known letter to Renan on "La Science idéale et la science positive" of La Révolution chimique, Lavoisier (1890), of Science et morale (1897), and of numerous articles in La Grande Encyclopédie, which he helped to establish.

- Untersuchungen über die Affinitäten, über Bildung und Zersetzung der Äther. Ostwalds Klassiker der exakten Wissenschaften; 173 Leipzig: Engelmann, 1910 Digital edition by the University and State Library Düsseldorf

=== Editions ===
- Introduction a l'étude de la chimie des anciens et du Moyen Age (in French). Paris: Steinheil. 1889.
- La Révolution chimique (in French). Paris: Alcan. 1890.

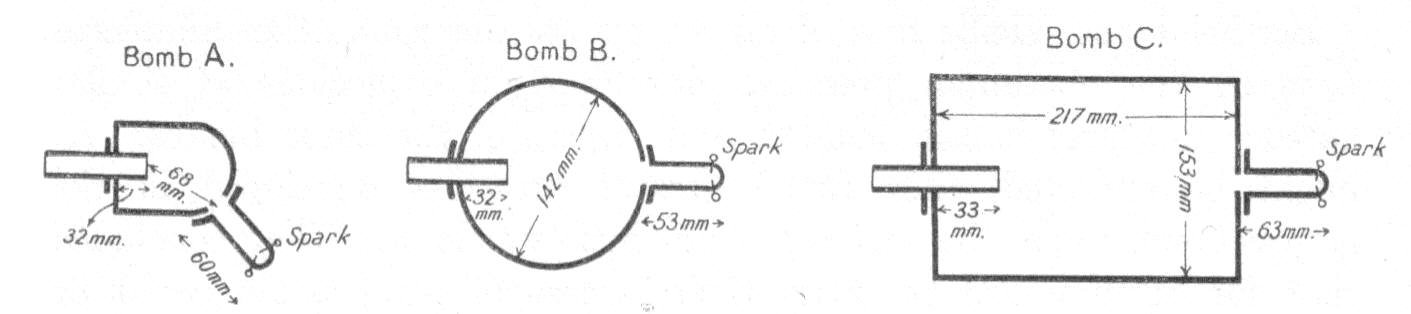
Bombs used for hydrogen explosion experiments

== Recognition ==
In 1863 he became a member of the Académie Nationale de Médecine; he was also awarded the Grand Cross of the Legion of Honour. He was elected a Foreign Honorary Member of the American Academy of Arts and Sciences in 1880. In 1881 he became a foreign member of the Royal Netherlands Academy of Arts and Sciences. He was elected an International Member of the United States National Academy of Sciences in 1833. He was awarded honorary membership of the Manchester Literary and Philosophical Society in 1886. In 1895, he was elected an International Member of the American Philosophical Society.

Avenue Berthelot in Lyon was named after him on 25 March 1907.

== Family ==
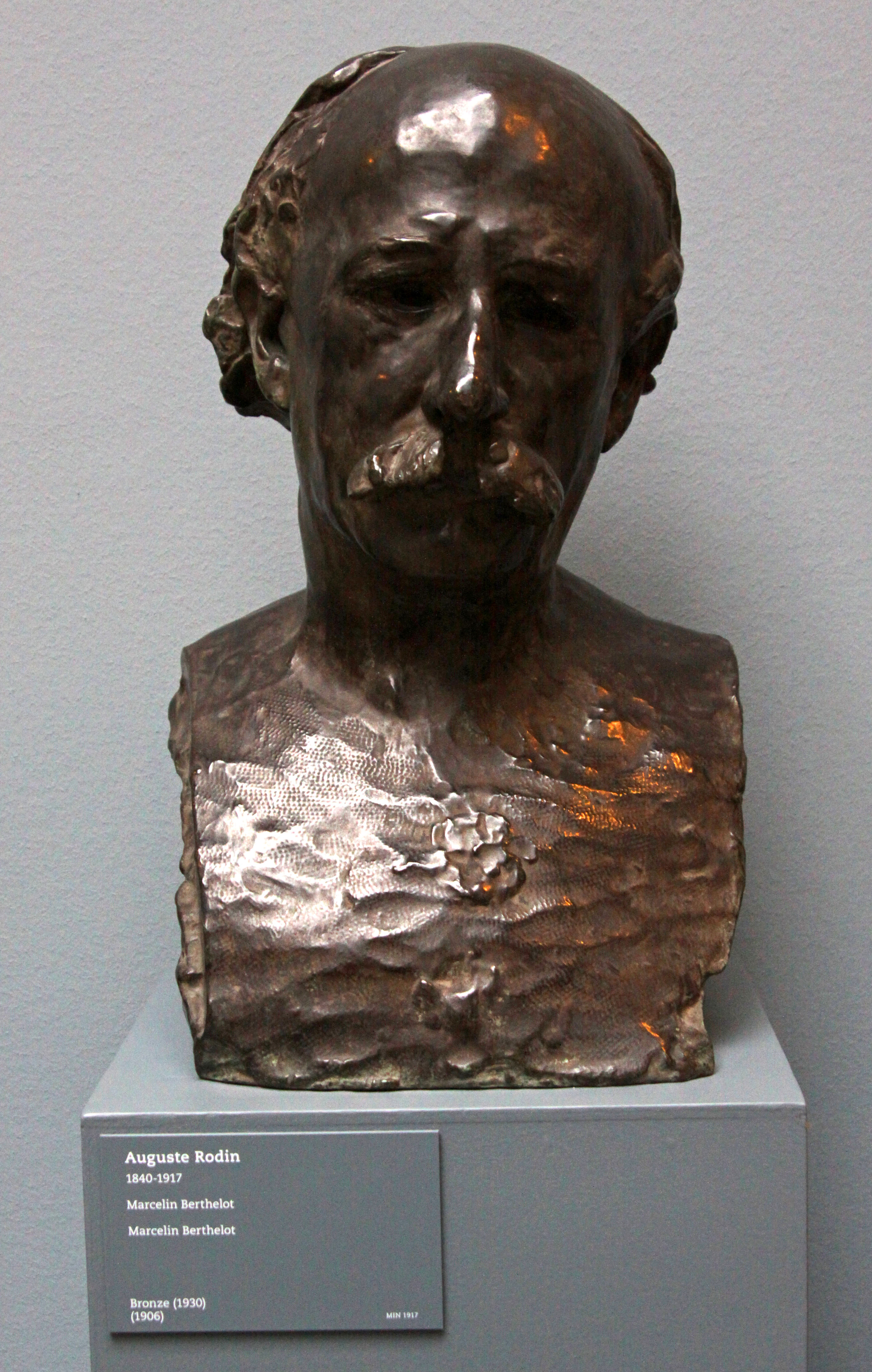
Rodin's bust of Berthelot. Ny Carlsberg Glyptotek, Copenhagen, Denmark

Berthelot died suddenly on 18 March 1907, immediately after the death of his wife Sophie Niaudet (1837–1907), in Paris. His professorship was filled by Emil Jungfleisch.

He was buried with his wife in the Panthéon. He had six children: Marcel André (1862–1939), Marie-Hélène (1863–1895), Camille (1864–1928), Daniel (1865–1927), Philippe (1866–1934), and René (1872–1960).

== In art ==
Auguste Rodin created a bust of Berthelot.

== See also ==
- Abiogenic petroleum origin
- Berthelot's reagent

== Notes ==
Political offices
Preceded by René Goblet	Minister of Public Instruction and Fine Arts; 1886–1887	Succeeded by Eugène Spuller
Preceded by Jean Casimir-Perier	Minister of Foreign Affairs; 1895–1896	Succeeded by Léon Bourgeois
