= Pressure perturbation calorimetry =

Method for measuring heat changes

Pressure perturbation calorimetry (PPC) is a technique closely related to isothermal titration calorimetry (ITC) and differential scanning calorimetry (DSC). In brief, PPC measures heat changes associated with dilute aqueous solutions of proteins or other biomolecules in response to introduction of relatively small pressure perturbations (± 5 atm). Importantly, such heat changes can be related to thermodynamic properties of proteins such as hydration and conformational transitions upon folding and/or ligand binding.

== See also ==
- Differential scanning calorimetry
- Isothermal microcalorimetry
- Isothermal titration calorimetry
- Sorption calorimetry

== Bibliography ==
- Lin, Lung-Nan; Brandts, John F.; Brandts, J. Michael; Plotnikov, Valerian (2002-03-01). "Determination of the volumetric properties of proteins and other solutes using pressure perturbation calorimetry". Analytical Biochemistry. 302 (1): 144–160. doi:10.1006/abio.2001.5524. ISSN 0003-2697. PMID 11846388.
- Zhai, Yong; Okoro, Linus; Cooper, Alan; Winter, Roland (2011-06-01). "Applications of pressure perturbation calorimetry in biophysical studies". Biophysical Chemistry. Special Issue: Biopolymer Solvation - Water and more!. 156 (1): 13–23. doi:10.1016/j.bpc.2010.12.010. ISSN 0301-4622. PMID 21255903.
- Heerklotz, Heiko; Seelig, Joachim (2002-03-01). "Application of pressure perturbation calorimetry to lipid bilayers". Biophysical Journal. 82 (3): 1445–1452. Bibcode:2002BpJ....82.1445H. doi:10.1016/S0006-3495(02)75498-2. ISSN 0006-3495. PMC 1301945. PMID 11867459.
