= Thermochimica Acta =

Peer-reviewed scientific journal

- Discipline: Chemistry
- Language: English
- Edited by: S. Vyazovkin, N. Koga, R. Androsch

Publication details
- History: 1970–present
- Publisher: Elsevier
- Frequency: Monthly
- Impact factor: 3.1 (2023)

Standard abbreviations
- ISO 4: Thermochim. Acta

Indexing
- ISSN: 0040-6031 (print); 1872-762X (web)

Links
- Journal homepage

Thermochimica Acta is a peer-reviewed scientific journal. It was previously multilingual but now publishes only English-language articles.

According to the Journal Citation Reports, the journal has a 2023 impact factor of 3.1.

== Topics ==
The journal publishes scientific articles on:

- Thermoanalytical techniques
- Methods of calorimetry
- Calorimetric material data (enthalpies, heat capacities, entropies, etc.)
- Applications of these techniques, methods, and data in chemistry, physics, biology, and engineering sciences

In addition to these focus areas, the journal also publishes articles on general thermodynamic subjects.
