= Richmann's law =

Richmann's law, sometimes referred to as Richmann's rule, Richmann's mixing rule, Richmann's rule of mixture or Richmann's law of mixture, is a physical law for calculating the mixing temperature when pooling multiple bodies. It is named after the Baltic German physicist Georg Wilhelm Richmann, who published the relationship in 1750, establishing the first general equation for calorimetric calculations.

== Origin ==
Through experimental measurements, Wilhelm Richmann determined that the following relationship holds when water of different temperatures is mixed:

$$m_{1} \cdot T_1 + m_2 \cdot T_2 = (m_{1} + m_{2})\cdot T_\mathrm{m}$$

It follows:

Initial Richman's law

$T_\mathrm{m}= \frac{m_{1} \cdot T_1 + m_2 \cdot T_2}{m_1 + m_2}$	Eq.1

Here $m_1$and $m_2$ are the masses of the two mixture components, $T_1$ and $T_2$ are their respective initial temperatures, and $T_m$ is the mixture temperature.

This observation is called Richmann's law in the narrower sense and applies in principle to all substances of the same state of aggregation. According to this, the mixing temperature is the weighted arithmetic mean of the temperatures of the two initial components.

Richmann's rule of mixing can also be applied in reverse, for example, to the question of the ratio in which quantities of water of given temperatures must be mixed to obtain water of a desired temperature. Determining the quantities $m_1$and $m_2$ required for this purpose, given a total quantity $M=m_1+m_2$, is accomplished with the mixing cross. The corresponding formula, obtained from the above equation by rearrangement, is:

$m_1=M \frac{T_m-T_2}{T_1-T_2}$ or $m_2=M \frac{T_m-T_1}{T_2-T_1}$.

For the mixing ratio, this gives:

$$\frac{m_1}{m_2} = - \frac{T_2-T_m}{T_1-T_m}$$.

The physical background of the mixing rule is the fact that the heat energy of a substance is directly proportional to its mass and its absolute temperature. The proportionality factor is the specific heat capacity, which depends on the nature of the substance, but which was not described until some time after Richmann's discovery by Joseph Black. Thus, the validity of the formula is limited to mixtures of the same substance, since it assumes a uniform specific heat capacity. Another condition is that both components be uniformly warm everywhere and that there be no appreciable heat exchange with their other surroundings.

If one wants to mix two substances with different - but known - specific heat capacities, one can formulate the mixing rule more generally, as shown below.

== General formulation ==
Under the condition that no change of aggregate state occurs and the system is closed, i.e., in particular, there is no heat exchange with the environment, the following holds:

$$\begin{align}
Q_\text{dispensed} & = Q_\text{absorbed}\\
m_{1} \cdot \left( h_{1}(T_1) - h_1(T_\mathrm m) \right) & = m_{2} \cdot \left( h_{2}(T_\mathrm{m}) - h_{2}(T_{2}) \right)\\
\end{align}$$

Where $h_1(T)$ and $h_2(T)$ represent the specific enthalpy of the respective components.

If the specific heat capacities $c_1$ and $c_2$ can be assumed to be constant, this can be transformed to.

$$\begin{align}
m_{1}\cdot c_{1}\cdot (T_{1}-T_\mathrm{m}) & = m_{2}\cdot c_{2}\cdot (T_\mathrm{m}-T_{2})
\end{align}$$

The formula resolved by the mixture temperature is then:

General Richman's law

$T_\mathrm{m} = \frac{m_{1}\cdot c_{1}\cdot T_{1}+m_{2}\cdot c_{2}\cdot T_{2}}{m_{1}\cdot c_{1}+m_{2}\cdot c_{2}}$	Eq.2

In a wider sense this equation is also referred to as Richmann's law because it simply extends Richmann's established relationship to include the specific heat capacity, thus allowing the calculation of the mixing temperature of different substances.

If the heat capacities are not constant over the entire temperature range, the above formula can be used with an average heat capacity for component $i$:

$$\bar{c}_{i} = \frac{\int_{T_\mathrm{m}}^{T_{i}} c_{i}(T) \, \mathrm dT }{T_{i} - T_\mathrm{m}}$$.

In this formula, $c_i(T)$ with $i=1$ or $2$ represents the specific heat capacity of the two components, which may be temperature dependent. Application of the formula may require an iterative procedure to determine the mixture temperature, since the average heat capacity is also temperature dependent.
