= Georg Wilhelm Richmann =

Baltic German physicist (1711–1753)

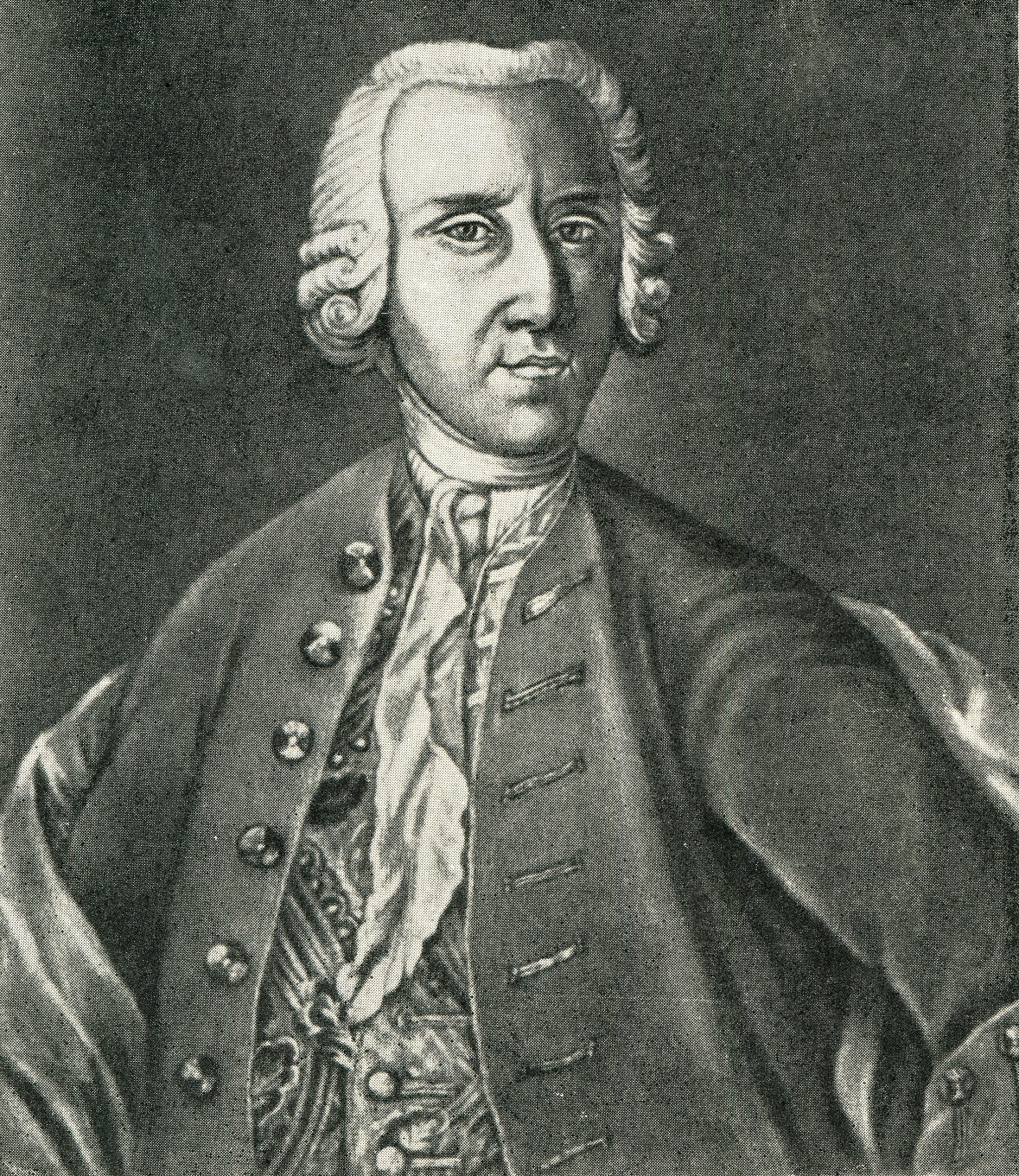
- Born: 22 July 1711; Pernau, Swedish Livonia
- Died: 6 August 1753 (aged 42); Saint Petersburg, Russia
- Cause of death: Electrocution
- Occupation: Physicist
- Known for: Richmann's law

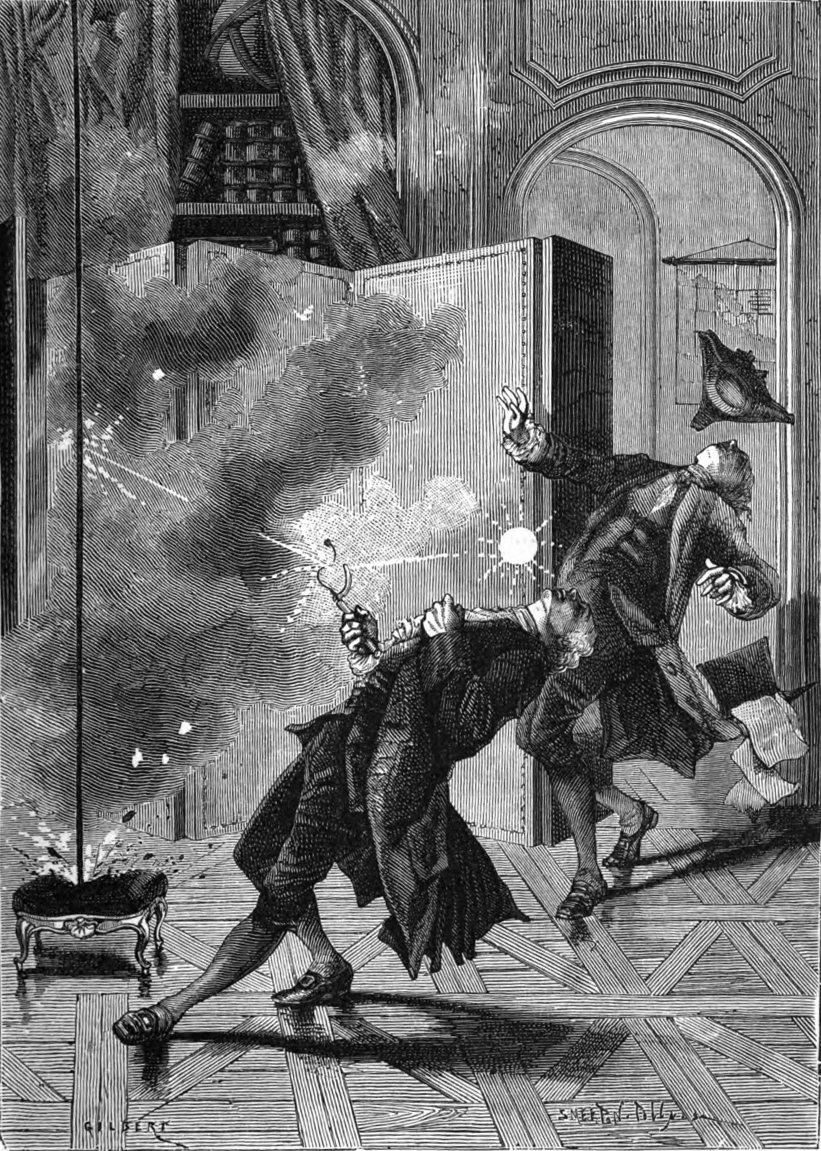
Richmann and his engraver during the electrocution in St. Petersburg

Georg Wilhelm Richmann (Russian: Георг Вильгельм Рихман; 22 July [O.S. 11 July] 1711 – 6 August [O.S. 26 July] 1753) was a Russian physicist of Baltic German origin who did pioneering work on electricity, atmospheric electricity, and calorimetry. He died by electrocution in St. Petersburg when struck by apparent ball lightning produced by an experiment attempting to ground the electrical discharge from a storm.

== Early life and education ==
Richmann was born on 22 July [O.S. 11 July] 1711 in the city of Pernau in Livonia, Swedish Empire (now Estonia). Richmann's father died of plague before he was born and his mother remarried. In his early years he studied in Reval (now Tallinn); later he studied in Germany at the universities of Halle and Jena.

== Career ==
After his education, Richmann spent the rest of his life as a professor of physics at the university in St. Petersburg and a center of scientific research. There he dealt with problems of thermodynamics and with investigations of electrical phenomena, contemporaneously with Benjamin Franklin.

He became famous for establishing the first general equation for calorimetric calculations. This law was later called Richmann's law in his honor.

Richmann also became famous for his investigations on thunderstorm electricity, which led to his tragic death in 1753. Richmann also worked as a tutor to the children of Count Andrei Osterman. Richmann translated Alexander Pope's Essay on Man into German from French, which appeared in 1741. In that year, he was also elected a member of the St. Petersburg Academy of Sciences.

== Accidental death ==
Richmann was electrocuted in Saint Petersburg on 6 August 1753 (Old Style, 26 July 1753) while "trying to quantify the response of an insulated rod to a nearby storm." He is said to have been attending a meeting of the Academy of Sciences when he heard thunder, whereupon he ran home with his engraver to capture the event for posterity. While the experiment was underway, a discharge reported to have been ball lightning appeared and collided with Richmann's head leaving him with a red spot on his forehead, his left shoe blown open, and parts of his clothes singed. The ball lightning arising from the apparatus was the cause of his death. An explosion followed "like that of a small Cannon" that knocked the engraver out, split the room's door frame, and tore the door off its hinges. This incident represents the first documented case of ball lightning, and Richmann appears to be the first person in history to have lost his life while conducting electrical experiments.

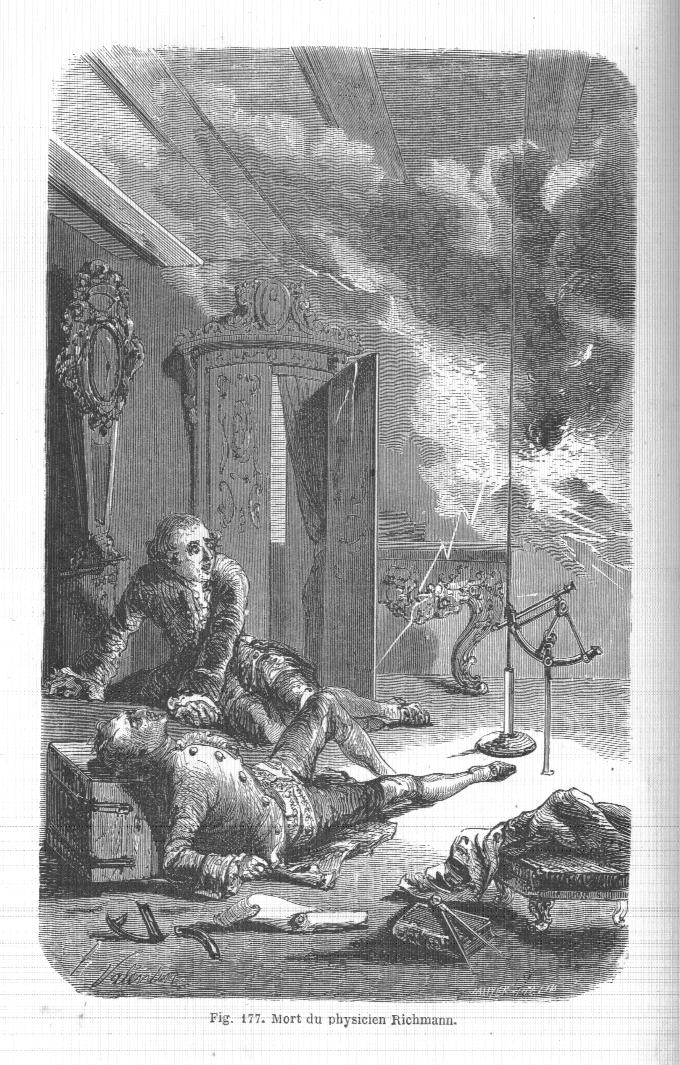
Richmann killed by lightning

== Sources ==
- "Рихман, Георг-Вильгельм" . Brockhaus and Efron Encyclopedic Dictionary (in Russian). 1906.
