= Isothermal microcalorimetry =

Measuring versus elapsed time the net rate of heat flow

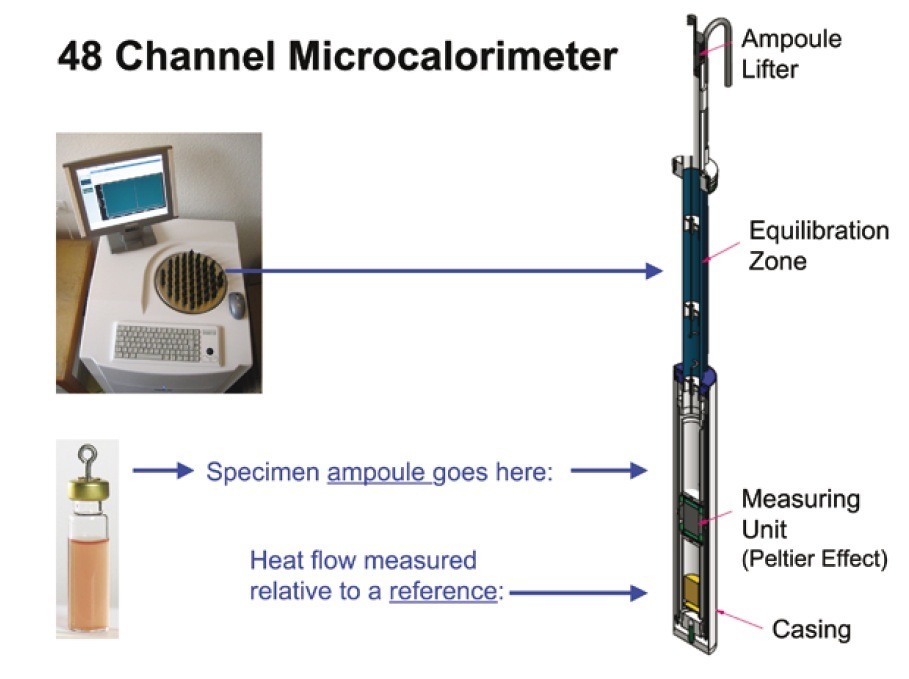
- Acronym: IMC
- Classification: Thermal analysis

Other techniques
- Related: Isothermal titration calorimetry Differential scanning calorimetry

Isothermal microcalorimetry (IMC) is a laboratory method for real-time monitoring and dynamic analysis of chemical, physical and biological processes. Over a period of hours or days, IMC determines the onset, rate, extent and energetics of such processes for specimens in small ampoules (e.g. 3–20 ml) at a constant set temperature (c. 15 °C–150 °C).

IMC accomplishes this dynamic analysis by measuring and recording vs. elapsed time the net rate of heat flow (μJ/s = μW) to or from the specimen ampoule, and the cumulative amount of heat (J) consumed or produced.

IMC is a powerful and versatile analytical tool for four closely related reasons:

1. All chemical and physical processes are either exothermic or endothermic—produce or consume heat.
2. The rate of heat flow is proportional to the rate of the process taking place.
3. IMC is sensitive enough to detect and follow either slow processes (reactions proceeding at a few % per year) in a few grams of material, or processes which generate minuscule amounts of heat (e.g. metabolism of a few thousand living cells).
4. IMC instruments generally have a huge dynamic range—heat flows as low as 1 μW and as high as 50,000 μW can be measured by the same instrument.

The IMC method of studying rates of processes is thus broadly applicable, provides real-time continuous data, and is sensitive. The measurement is simple to make, takes place unattended and is non-interfering (e.g. no fluorescent or radioactive markers are needed).

However, there are two main caveats that must be heeded in use of IMC:

1. Missed data: If externally prepared specimen ampoules are used, it takes about 40 minutes to slowly introduce an ampoule into the instrument without significant disturbance of the set temperature in the measurement module. Thus any processes taking place during this time are not monitored.
2. Extraneous data: IMC records the aggregate net heat flow produced or consumed by all processes taking place within an ampoule. Therefore, in order to be sure what process or processes are producing the measured heat flow, great care must be taken in both experimental design and in the initial use of related chemical, physical and biologic assays.

In general, possible applications of IMC are only limited by the imagination of the person who chooses to employ it as an analytical tool and the physical constraints of the method. Besides the two general limitations (main caveats) described above, these constraints include specimen and ampoule size, and the temperatures at which measurements can be made. IMC is generally best suited to evaluating processes which take place over hours or days. IMC has been used in an extremely wide range of applications, and many examples are discussed in this article, supported by references to published literature. Applications discussed range from measurement of slow oxidative degradation of polymers and instability of hazardous industrial chemicals to detection of bacteria in urine and evaluation of the effects of drugs on parasitic worms. The present emphasis in this article is applications of the latter type—biology and medicine.

== Overview ==
=== Definition, purpose, and scope ===
Calorimetry is the science of measuring the heat of chemical reactions or physical changes. Calorimetry is performed with a calorimeter.

Isothermal microcalorimetry (IMC) is a laboratory method for real-time, continuous measurement of the heat flow rate (μJ/s = μW) and cumulative amount of heat (J) consumed or produced at essentially constant temperature by a specimen placed in an IMC instrument. Such heat is due to chemical or physical changes taking place in the specimen. The heat flow is proportional to the aggregate rate of changes taking place at a given time. The aggregate heat produced during a given time interval is proportional to the cumulative amount of aggregate changes which have taken place.

IMC is thus a means for dynamic, quantitative evaluation of the rates and energetics of a broad range of rate processes, including biological processes. A rate process is defined here as a physical and/or chemical change whose progress over time can be described either empirically or by a mathematical model (Bibliography: Glasstone, et al. 1941 and Johnson, et al. 1974 and rate equation).

The simplest use of IMC is detecting that one or more rate processes are taking place in a specimen because heat is being produced or consumed at a rate that is greater than the detection limit of the instrument used. This can be a useful, for example, as a general indicator that a solid or liquid material is not inert but instead is changing at a given temperature. In biological specimens containing a growth medium, appearance over time of a detectable and rising heat flow signal is a simple general indicator of the presence of some type of replicating cells.

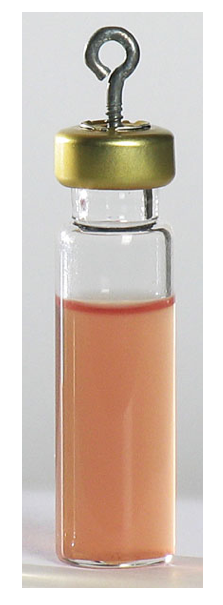
Example of a 4 ml ampoule for IMC studies. Fig. 1

However, for most applications it is paramount to know, by some means, what process or processes are being measured by monitoring heat flow. In general this entails first having detailed physical, chemical and biological knowledge of the items placed in an IMC ampoule before it is placed in an IMC instrument for evaluation of heat flow over time. It is also then necessary to analyze the ampoule contents after IMC measurements of heat flow have been made for one or more periods of time. Also, logic-based variations in ampoule contents can be used to identify the specific source or sources of heat flow. When rate process and heat flow relationships have been established, it is then possible to rely directly on the IMC data.

What IMC can measure in practice depends in part on specimen dimensions, and they are necessarily constrained by instrument design. A given commercial instrument typically accepts specimens of up to a fixed diameter and height. Instruments accepting specimens with dimensions of up to 1 or 2 cm in diameter by 5 cm in height are typical. In a given instrument larger specimens of a given type usually produce greater heat flow signals, and this can augment detection and precision.

Frequently, specimens are simple 3 to 20 ml cylindrical ampoules (Fig. 1) containing materials whose rate processes are of interest—e.g. solids, liquids, cultured cells—or any combination of these or other items expected to result in production or consumption of heat. Many useful IMC measurements can be carried out using simple sealed ampoules, and glass ampoules are common since glass is not prone to undergoing heat-producing chemical or physical changes. However, metal or polymeric ampoules are sometimes employed. Also, instrument/ampoule systems are available which allow injection or controlled through-flow of gasses or liquids and/or provide specimen mechanical stirring.

Commercial IMC instruments allow heat flow measurements at temperatures ranging from 15 °C to 150 °C. The range for a given instrument may be somewhat different.

IMC is extremely sensitive – e.g. heat from slow chemical reactions in specimens weighing a few grams, taking place at reactant consumption rates of a few percent per year, can be detected and quantified in a matter of days. Examples include gradual oxidation of polymeric implant materials and shelf life studies of solid pharmaceutical drug formulations (Applications: Solid materials).

Also the rate of metabolic heat production of e.g. a few thousand living cells, microorganisms or protozoa in culture in an IMC ampoule can be measured. The amount of such metabolic heat can be correlated (through experimentation) with the number of cells or organisms present. Thus, IMC data can be used to monitor in real time the number of cells or organisms present and the net rate of growth or decline in this number (Applications: Biology and medicine).

Although some non-biological applications of IMC are discussed (Applications: Solid materials) the present emphasis in this article is on the use of IMC in connection with biological processes (Applications: Biology and medicine).

=== Data obtained ===
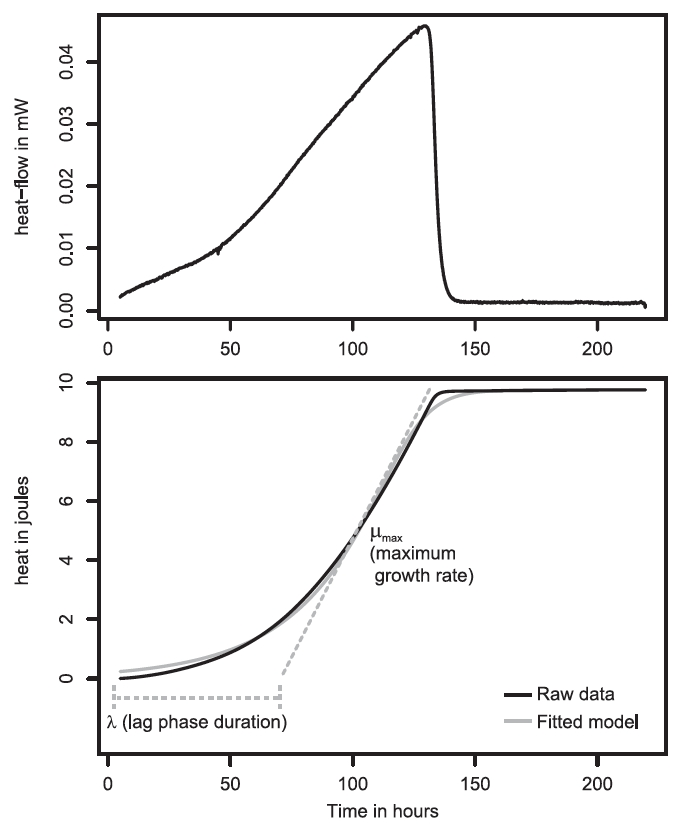
A plot of IMC data for a generic exothermic rate process in a sealed ampoule in which the process (and thus the heat flow) begins, accelerates, reaches a peak and then subsides. Below the heat flow plot is a plot showing integration of the heat flow data to give accumulated heat vs. time. As illustrated graphically, the lag phase duration and maximum heat generation rate (growth rate) can be calculated from the integrated data (after Howell, et al. 2011. Used with publisher permission). Fig. 2

A graphic display of a common type of IMC data is shown in Fig. 2. At the top is a plot of recorded heat flow (μJ/s = μW) vs. time from a specimen in a sealed ampoule, due to an exothermic rate process which begins, accelerates, reaches a peak heat flow and then subsides. Such data are directly useful (e.g. detection of a process and its duration under fixed conditions) but the data are also easily assessed mathematically to determine process parameters. For example, Fig. 2 also shows an integration of the heat flow data, giving accumulated heat (J) vs. time. As shown, parameters such as the maximum growth (heat generation) rate of the process, and the duration time of the lag phase before the process reaches maximum heat can be calculated from the integrated data. Calculations using heat flow rate data stored as computer files are easily automated. Analyzing IMC data in this manner to determine growth parameters has important applications the life sciences (Applications: Biology and medicine). Also, heat flow rates obtained at a series of temperatures can be used to obtain the activation energy of the process being evaluated (Hardison et al. 2003).

=== Development history ===
Lavoisier and Laplace are credited with creating and using the first isothermal calorimeter around 1780 (Bibliography: Lavoisier A & Laplace PS 1780). Their instrument employed ice to produce a relatively constant temperature in a confined space. They realized that when they placed a heat-producing specimen on the ice (e.g. a live animal), the mass of liquid water produced by the melting ice was directly proportional to the heat produced by the specimen.

Many modern IMC instrument designs stem from work done in Sweden in the late 1960s and early 1970s (Wadsö 1968, Suurkuusk & Wadsö 1974). This work took advantage of the parallel development of solid-state electronic devices—particularly commercial availability of small thermoelectric effect (Peltier-Seebeck) devices for converting heat flow into voltage—and vice versa.

In the 1980s, multi-channel designs emerged (Suurkuusk 1982), which allow parallel evaluation of multiple specimens. This greatly increased the power and usefulness of IMC and led to efforts to fine-tune the method (Thorén et al. 1989). Much of the further design and development done in the 1990s was also accomplished in Sweden by Wadsö and Suurkuusk and their colleagues. This work took advantage of the parallel development of personal computer technology which greatly augmented the ability to easily store, process and interpret heat flow vs. time data.

Instrument development work since the 1990s has taken further advantage of the continued development of solid-state electronics and personal computer technology. This has created IMC instruments of increasing sensitivity and stability, numbers of parallel channels, and even greater ability to conveniently record, store and rapidly process IMC data. In connection with wider use, substantial attention has been paid to creating standards for describing the performance of IMC instruments (e.g. precision, accuracy, sensitivity) and for methods of calibration (Wadsö and Goldberg 2001).

== Instruments and measurement principles ==
=== Instrument configurations ===
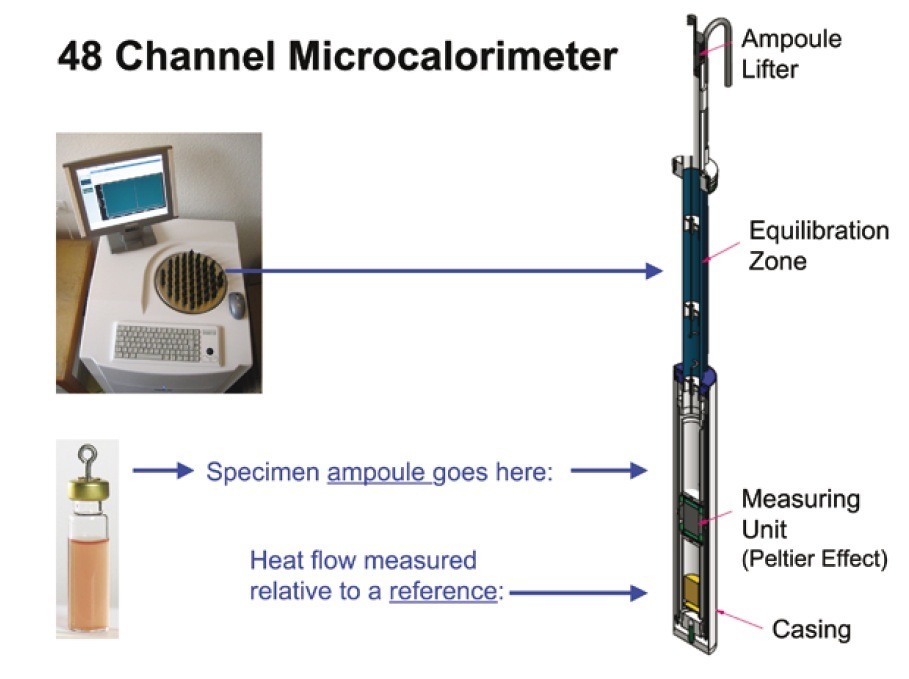
Overview of an IMC instrument which contains 48 separate calorimetry modules. One module is shown. All the modules operate at a given set temperature controlled by the instrument thermostat, but measurements can be started and stopped separately in each module. (With permission, Waters-TA Instruments, Wilmington DE, USA. http://www.tainstruments.com/ ) Fig. 3

Modern IMC instruments are actually semi-adiabatic—i.e. heat transfer between the specimen and its surroundings is not zero (adiabatic), because IMC measurement of heat flow depends on the existence of a small temperature differential—about 0.001 °C. However, because the differential is so low, IMC measurements are essentially isothermal. Fig. 3. shows an overview of an IMC instrument which contains 48 separate heat flow measurement modules. One module is shown. The module's measuring unit is typically a Peltier-Seebeck device. The device produces a voltage proportional to the temperature difference between a specimen which is producing or consuming heat and a thermally inactive reference which is at the temperature of the heat sink. The temperature difference is in turn proportional to the rate at which the specimen is producing or consuming heat (see Calibration below). All the modules in an instrument use the same heat sink and thermostat and thus all produce data at the same set temperature. However, it is generally possible to start and stop measurements in each ampoule independently. In a highly parallel (e.g. 48-channel) instrument like the one shown in Fig. 3, this makes it possible to perform (start and stop) several different experiments whenever it is convenient to do so.

Alternatively, IMC instruments can be equipped with duplex modules which yield signals proportional to the heat flow difference between two ampoules. One of two such duplex ampoules is often a blank or control—i.e. a specimen which does not contain the material producing the rate process of interest, but whose content is otherwise identical to that which is in the specimen ampoule. This provides a means for eliminating minor heat-producing reactions which are not of interest—for example gradual chemical changes over a period of days in a cell culture medium at the measurement temperature. Many useful IMC measurements can be carried out using simple sealed ampoules. However, as mentioned above, instrument/ampoule systems are available which allow or even control flow of gasses or liquids to and/or from the specimens and/or provide specimen mechanical stirring.

=== Reference inserts ===
Heat flow is usually measured relative to a reference insert, as shown in Fig. 3. This is typically a metal coupon that is chemically and physically stable at any temperature in the instrument's operating range and thus will not produce or consume heat itself. For best performance, the reference should have a heat capacity close to that of the specimen (e.g. IMC ampoule plus contents).

=== Modes of operation ===
==== Heat conduction (hc) mode ====
Commercial IMC instruments are often operated as heat conduction (hc) calorimeters in which heat produced by the specimen (i.e. material in an ampoule) flows to the heat sink, typically an aluminum block contained in a thermostat (e.g. constant temperature bath). As mentioned above, an IMC instrument operating in hc mode is not precisely isothermal because small differences between the set temperature and the specimen temperature necessarily exist—so that there is measurable heat flow. However, small variations in specimen temperature do not significantly affect heat sink temperature because the heat capacity of the heat sink is much higher than the specimen—usually about 100×.

Heat transfer between the specimen and the heat sink takes place through a Peltier-Seebeck device, allowing dynamic measurement of heat produced or consumed. In research-quality instruments, thermostat/heat sink temperature is typically accurate to < ±0.1 K and maintained within < ±100 μK/24h. The precision with which heat sink temperature is maintained over time is a major determinant of the precision of the heat flow measurements over time. An advantage of hc mode is a large dynamic range. Heat flows of 50,000 μW can be measured with a precision of ±0.2 μW. Thus measuring a heat flow of >0.2 μW above baseline constitutes detection of heat flow, although a more conservative detection of 10× the precision limit is often used.

==== Power compensation (pc) mode ====
Some IMC instruments operate (or can also be operated) as power compensation (pc) calorimeters. In this case, in order to maintain the specimen at the set temperature, heat produced is compensated using a Peltier-Seebeck device. Heat consumed is compensated either by an electric heater or by reversing the polarity of the device (van Herwaarden, 2000). If a given instrument is operated in pc mode rather than hc, the precision of heat flow measurement remains the same (e.g. ±0.2 μW). The advantage of compensation mode is a smaller time constant – i.e. the time needed to detect a given heat flow pulse is about ten times shorter than in conduction mode. The disadvantage is a tenfold smaller dynamic range compared to hc mode.

=== Calibration ===
For operation in either hc or pc mode, routine calibration in commercial instruments is usually accomplished with built-in electric heaters. The performance of the electrical heaters can in turn be validated using specimens of known heat capacity or which produce chemical reactions whose heat production per unit mass is known from thermodynamics (Wadsö and Goldberg 2001). In either hc or pc mode, the resulting signal is a computer-recordable voltage, calibrated to represent specimen μ W-range heat flow vs. time. Specifically, if no significant thermal gradients exist in the specimen, then P = e_{C} [U + t (dU/dt)], where P is heat flow (i.e. μW), ε_{C} is the calibration constant, U the measured potential difference across the thermopile, and t the time constant. Under steady-state conditions—for example during the release of a constant electrical calibration current, this simplifies to P = e_{C} U. (Wadsö and Goldberg 2001).

=== Ampoules ===
Many highly useful IMC measurements can be conducted in sealed ampoules (Fig. 1) which offer advantages of simplicity, protection from contamination and (where needed) a substantial margin of bio-safety for persons handling or exposed to the ampoules. A closed ampoule can contain any desired combination of solids, liquids, gasses or items of biologic origin. Initial gas composition in the ampoule head space can be controlled by sealing the ampoule in the desired gas environment.

However, there are also IMC instrument/ampoule designs which permit controlled flow of gas or liquid through the ampoule during measurement and/or mechanical stirring. Also, with proper accessories, some IMC instruments can be operated as ITC (isothermal titration calorimetry) instruments. The topic of ITC is covered elsewhere (see Isothermal titration calorimetry). In addition some IMC instruments can record heat flow while the temperature is slowly changed (scanned) over time. The scanning rate has to be slow (around ± 2 °C/h) in order to keep IMC-scale specimens (e.g. a few grams) sufficiently close to the heat sink temperature (< 0.1 °C). Fast scanning of temperature is the province of differential scanning calorimetry (DSC) instruments which generally use much smaller specimens. Some DSC instruments can be operated in IMC mode, but the small ampoule (and therefore specimen) size needed for scanning limit the utility and sensitivity of DSC instruments used in IMC mode.

== Basic methodology ==
=== Setting a temperature ===
Heat flow rate (μJ/s = μW) measurements are accomplished by first setting an IMC instrument thermostat at a selected temperature and allowing the instrument's heat sink to stabilize at that temperature. If an IMC instrument operating at one temperature is set to a new temperature, re-stabilization at the new temperature setting may take several hours—even a day. As explained above, achievement and maintenance of a precisely stable temperature is fundamental to achieving precise heat flow measurements in the μW range over extended times (e.g. days).

=== Introducing a specimen ===
After temperature stabilization, if an externally prepared ampoule (or some solid specimen of ampoule dimensions) is used, it is slowly introduced (e.g. lowered) into an instrument's measurement module, usually in a staged operation. The purpose is to ensure that by the time the ampoule/specimen is in the measurement position, its temperature is close to (within c. 0.001 °C) of the measurement temperature. This is so that any heat flow then measured is due to specimen rate processes rather than due to a continuing process of bringing the specimen to the set temperature. The time for introduction of a specimen in a 3–20 ml IMC ampoule into measurement position is about 40 minutes in many instruments. This means that heat flow from any processes which take place within a specimen during that the introduction period will not be recorded.

If an in-place ampoule is used, and some agent or specimen is injected, this also produces a period of instability, but it is on the order of 1 minute. Fig. 5 provides examples of both the long period needed to stabilize an instrument if an ampoule is introduced directly, and the short period of instability due to injection.

=== Recording data ===
After the introduction process, specimen heat flow can be precisely recorded continuously, for as long as it is of interest. The extreme stability of research-grade instruments (< ±100 μK/24h ) means that accurate measurements can be (and often are) made for a period of days. Since the heat flow signal is essentially readable in real time, it serves as a means for deciding whether or not heat flow of interest is still occurring. Also, modern instruments store heat flow vs. time data as computer files, so both real-time and retrospective graphic display and mathematical analysis of data are possible.

== Usability ==
As indicated below, IMC has many advantages as a method for analyzing rate processes, but there are also some caveats that must be heeded.

=== Advantages ===
==== Broadly applicable ====
Any rate process can be studied—if suitable specimens will fit IMC instrument module geometry, and proceed at rates amenable to IMC methodology (see above). As shown under Applications, IMC is in use to quantify an extremely wide range of rate processes in vitro—e.g. from solid-state stability of polymers (Hardison et al. 2003) to efficacy of drug compounds against parasitic worms (Maneck et al. 2011). IMC can also determine the aggregate rate of uncharacterized, complex, or multiple interactions (Lewis & Daniels). This is especially useful for comparative screening—e.g. the effects of different combinations of material composition and/or fabrication processes on overall physico-chemical stability.

==== Real-time and continuous ====
IMC heat flow data are obtained as voltage fluctuations vs. time, stored as computer files and can be displayed essentially in real time—as the rate process is occurring. The heat flow-related voltage is continuous over time, but in modern instruments it is normally sampled digitally. The frequency of digital sampling can be controlled as needed—i.e. frequent sampling of rapid heat flow changes for better time resolution or slower sampling of slow changes in order to limit data file size.

==== Sensitive and fast ====
IMC is sensitive enough to detect and quantify in short times (hours, days) reactions which consume only a few percent of reactants over long times (months). IMC thus avoids long waits often needed until enough reaction product has accumulated for conventional (e.g. chemical) assays. This applies to both physical and biological specimens (see Applications).

==== Direct ====
At each combination of specimen variables and set temperature of interest, IMC provides direct determination of the heat flow kinetics and cumulative heat of rate processes. This avoids any need to assume that a rate process remains the same when temperature or other controlled variables are changed before an IMC measurement.

==== Simple ====
For comparisons of the effect of experimental variables (e.g. initial concentrations) on rate processes, IMC does not require development and use of chemical or other assay methods. If absolute data are required (e.g. quantity of product produced by a process), then assays can be conducted in parallel on specimens identical to those used for IMC (and/or on IMC specimens after IMC runs). The resultant assay data is used to calibrate the rate data obtained by IMC.

==== Non-interfering ====
IMC does not require adding markers (e.g. fluorescent or radioactive substances) to capture rate processes. Unadulterated specimens can be used, and after an IMC run, the specimen is unchanged (except by the processes which have taken place). The post-IMC specimen can be subjected to any kind of physical, chemical, morphological or other evaluation of interest.

=== Caveats ===
==== Missed data ====
As indicated in the methodology description, when the IMC method of inserting a sealed ampoule is used, it is not possible to capture heat flow during the first 40 minutes or so while the specimen is slowly being brought to the set temperature. In this mode therefore, IMC is best suited to studying processes which start slowly or occur slowly at a given temperature. This caveat also applies to the time before insertion—i.e. time elapsed between preparing a specimen (in which a rate process may then start) and starting the IMC insertion process (Charlebois et al. 2003). This latter effect is usually minimized if the temperature chosen for IMC is substantially higher (e.g. 37 °C) than the temperature at which the specimen is prepared (e.g. 25 °C).

==== Extraneous data ====
IMC captures the aggregate heat production or consumption resulting from all processes taking place within a specimen, including for example

- Possible changes in the physico-chemical state of the specimen ampoule itself; e.g. stress relaxation in metal components, oxidation of polymeric components.
- Degradation of a culture medium in which metabolism and growth of living cells is being studied.

Thus great care must be taken in experimental planning and design to identify all possible processes which may be taking place. It is often necessary to design and conduct preliminary studies intended to systematically determine if multiple processes are taking place and if so, their contributions to aggregate heat flow. One strategy, in order to eliminate extraneous heat flow data, is to compare heat flow for a specimen in which the rate process of interest is taking place with that from a blank specimen which includes everything in the specimen of interest—except the item which will undergo the rate process of interest. This can be directly accomplished with instruments having duplex IMC modules which report the net heat flow difference between two ampoules.

== Applications ==
After a discussion of some special sources of IMC application information, several specific categories of IMC analysis of rate processes are covered, and recent examples (with literature references) are discussed in each category.

=== Special sources of IMC application information ===
==== Handbooks ====
The Bibliography lists the four extensive volumes of the Handbook of Thermal Analysis and Calorimetry: Vol. 1 Principles and Practice (1998), Vol. 2 Applications to Inorganic and Miscellaneous Materials (2003), Vol. 3 Applications to Polymers and Plastics (2002), and Vol. 4 From Macromolecules to Man (1999). These constitute a prime source of information on (and literature references to) IMC applications and examples published prior to 2000.

==== Application notes ====
Some IMC instrument manufacturers have assembled application notes, and make them available to the public. The notes are often (but not always) adaptations of journal papers. An example is the Microcalorimetry Compendium Vol. I and II offered by TA Instruments, Inc. and listed in the Bibliography.

"Proteins" the first section of notes in Vol. I, is not of interest here, as it describes studies employing Isothermal titration calorimetry. The subsequent sections of Vol. I, Life & Biological Sciences and Pharmaceuticals contain application notes for both IMC and Differential scanning calorimetry. Vol. II of the compendium is devoted almost entirely to IMC applications. Its sections are entitled Cement, Energetics, Material and Other. A possible drawback to these two specific compendia is that none of the notes are dated. Although the compendia were published in 2009, some of the notes describe IMC instruments which were in use years ago and are no longer available. Thus, some of the notes, while still relevant and instructive, often describe studies done before 2000.

=== Examples of applications ===
In general, possible applications of IMC are only limited by the imagination of the person who chooses to employ IMC as an analytical tool—within the previously described constraints presented by existing IMC instruments and methodology. This is because it is a universal means for monitoring any chemical, physical or biological rate process. Below are some IMC application categories with examples in each. In most categories, there are many more published examples than those mentioned and referenced. The categories are somewhat arbitrary and often overlap. A different set of categories might be just as logical, and more categories could be added.

==== Solid materials ====
===== Formation =====
IMC is widely used for studying the rates of formation of a variety of materials by various processes. It is best suited to study processes which occur slowly—i.e. over hours or days. A prime example is the study of hydration and setting reactions of calcium mineral cement formulations. One paper provides an overview (Gawlicki, et al. 2010) and another describes a simple approach (Evju 2003). Other studies focus on insights into cement hydration provided by IMC combined with IR spectroscopy (Ylmen et al. 2010) and on using IMC to study the influence of compositional variables on cement hydration and setting times (Xu et al. 2011).

IMC can also be conveniently used to study the rate and amount of hydration (in air of known humidity) of calcium minerals or other minerals. To provide air of known humidity for such studies, small containers of saturated salt solutions can be placed in an IMC ampoule along with a non-hydrated mineral specimen. The ampoule is then sealed and introduced into an IMC instrument. The saturated salt solution keeps the air in the ampoule at a known rH, and various common salt solutions provide humidities ranging from e.g. 32-100% rH. Such studies have been performed on μm size range calcium hydroxyapatite particles and calcium-containing bioactive glass "nano" particles (Doostmohammadi et al. 2011).

===== Stability =====
IMC is well suited for rapidly quantifying the rates of slow changes in materials (Willson et al. 1995). Such evaluations are variously described as studies of stability, degradation, or shelf life.

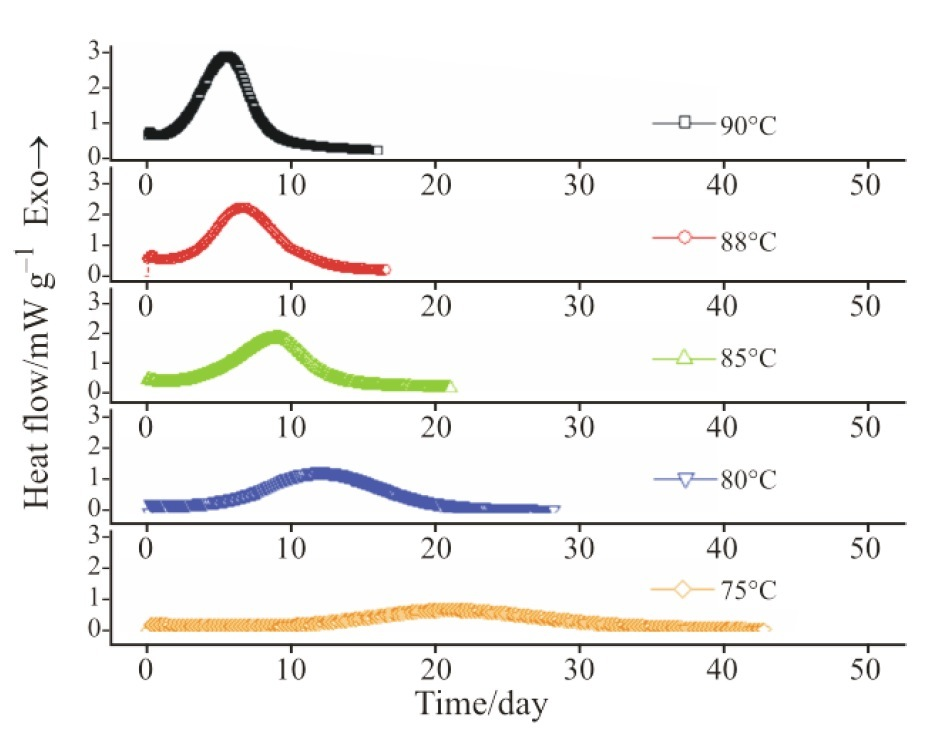
Heat flow vs. time for the thermal decomposition of 80 mass% CHP (cumene hydroperoxide) at a series of temperatures. CHP is an industrial chemical intermediate and polymerization initiator which is a documented fire and explosion hazard. According to the authors, neither differential scanning calorimetry or adiabatic calorimetry was sensitive enough to capture these data (from Chen et al. 2008 with publisher permission). Fig. 4

For example, IMC has been widely used for many years in shelf life studies of solid drug formulations in the pharmaceutical industry (Pikal et al. 1989, Hansen et al. 1990, Konigbauer et al. 1992.) IMC has the ability to detect slow degradation during simulated shelf storage far sooner than conventional analytical methods and without the need to employ chemical assay techniques. IMC is also a rapid, sensitive method for determining the often functionally crucial amorphous content of drugs such as nifedipine (Vivoda et al. 2011).

IMC can be used for rapidly determining the rate of slow changes in industrial polymers. For example, gamma radiation sterilization of a material frequently used for surgical implants—ultra-high-molecular-weight polyethylene (UHMWPE)—is known to produce free radicals in the polymer. The result is slow oxidation and gradual undesirable embrittlement of the polymer on the shelf or in vivo. IMC could detect oxidation-related heat and quantified an oxidation rate of 1% per year in irradiated UHMWPE at room temperature in air (Charlebois et al. 2003). In a related study the activation energy was determined from measurements at a series of temperatures (Hardison et al. 2003).

IMC is also of great utility in evaluating the "runaway potential" of materials which are significant fire or explosion hazards. For example, it has been used to determine autocatalytic kinetics of cumene hydroperoxide (CHP), an intermediate which is used in the chemical industry and whose sudden decomposition has caused a number of fires and explosions. Fig. 4 Shows the IMC data documenting thermal decomposition of CHP at 5 different temperatures (Chen et al. 2008).

==== Biology and medicine ====
The term metabolismics can be used to describe studies of the quantitative measurement of the rate at which heat is produced or consumed vs. time by cells (including microbes) in culture, by tissue specimens, or by small whole organisms. As described subsequently, metabolismics can be useful as a diagnostic tool; especially in either (a) identifying the nature of a specimen from its heat flow vs. time signature under a given set of conditions, or (b) determining the effects of e.g. pharmaceutical compounds on metabolic processes, organic growth or viability. Metabolismics is related to metabolomics. The latter is the systematic study of the unique chemical fingerprints that specific cellular processes leave behind; i.e. the study of their small-molecule metabolite profiles. When IMC is used to determine metabolismics, the products of the metabolic processes studied are subsequently available for metabolomics studies. Since IMC does not employ biochemical or radioactive markers, the post-IMC specimens consist only of metabolic products and remaining culture medium (if any was used). If metabolismics and metabolomics are used together, they can provide a comprehensive record of a metabolic process taking place in vitro: its rate and energetics, and its metabolic products.

To determine metabolismics using IMC, there must of course be sufficient cells, tissue or organisms initially present (or present later if replication is taking place during IMC measurements) to generate a heat flow signal above a given instrument's detection limit. A landmark 2002 general paper on the topic of metabolism provides an excellent perspective from which to consider IMC metabolismic studies (see Bibliography, West, Woodruff and Brown 2002). It describes how metabolic rates are related and how they scale over the entire range from "molecules and mitochondria to cells and mammals". Importantly for IMC, the authors also note that while the metabolic rate of a given type of mammalian cell in vivo declines markedly with increasing animal size (mass), the size of the donor animal has no effect on the metabolic rate of the cell when cultured in vitro.

===== Cell and tissue biology =====
Mammalian cells in culture have a metabolic rate of 30 × 10^{−12} W/cell (Figs. 2 and 3 in Bibliography: West, Woodruff and Brown 2002). By definition, IMC instruments have a sensitivity of at least 1 × 10^{−6} W (i.e. 1 μW). Therefore, the metabolic heat of 33,000 cells is detectable. Based on this sensitivity, IMC was used to perform a large number of pioneering studies of cultured mammalian cell metabolismics in the 1970s and 1980s in Sweden. One paper (Monti 1990) serves as an extensive guide to work done up until 1990. It includes explanatory text and 42 references to IMC studies of heat flow from cultured human erythrocytes, platelets, lymphocytes, lymphoma cells, granulocytes, adipocytes, skeletal muscle, and myocardial tissue. The studies were done to determine how and where IMC might be used as a clinical diagnostic method and/or provide insights into metabolic differences between cells from healthy persons and persons with various diseases or health problems.

Developments since 2000 in IMC (e.g. massively parallel instruments, real-time, computer-based storage and analysis of heat flow data) have stimulated further use of IMC in cultured cell biology. For example, IMC has been evaluated for assessing antigen-induced lymphocyte proliferation (Murigande et al. 2009) and revealed aspects of proliferation not seen using a conventional non-continuous radioactive marker assay method. IMC has also been applied to the field of tissue engineering. One study (Santoro et al. 2011) demonstrated that IMC could be used to measure the growth (i.e. proliferation) rate in culture of human chondrocytes harvested for tissue engineering use. It showed that IMC can potentially serve to determine the effectiveness of different growth media formulations and also determine whether cells donated by a given individual can be grown efficiently enough to consider using them to produce engineered tissue.

IMC has also been used to measure the metabolic response of cultured macrophages to surgical implant wear debris. IMC showed that the response was stronger to μm size range particles of polyethylene than to similarly sized Co alloy particles (Charlebois et al. 2002). A related paper covers the general topic of applying IMC in the field of synthetic solid materials used in surgery and medicine (Lewis and Daniels 2003).

At least two studies have suggested IMC can be of substantial use in tumor pathology. In one study (Bäckman 1990), the heat production rate of T-lymphoma cells cultured in suspension was measured. Changes in temperature and pH induced significant variations, but stirring rate and cell concentration did not. A more direct study of possible diagnostic use (Kallerhoff et al. 1996) produced promising results. For the uro-genital tissue biopsy specimens studied, the results showed

"it is possible to differentiate between normal and tumorous tissue samples by microcalorimetric measurement based on the distinctly higher metabolic activity of malignant tissue. Furthermore, microcalorimetry allows a differentiation and classification of tissue samples into their histological grading."

===== Toxicology =====
As of 2012, IMC has not become widely used in cultured cell toxicology even though it has been used periodically and successfully since the 1980s. IMC is advantageous in toxicology when it is desirable to observe cultured cell metabolism in real time and to quantify the rate of metabolic decline as a function of the concentration of a possibly toxic agent. One of the earliest reports (Ankerst et al. 1986) of IMC use in toxicology was a study of antibody-dependent cellular toxicity (ADCC) against human melanoma cells of various combinations of antiserum, monoclonal antibodies and also peripheral blood lymphocytes as effector cells. Kinetics of melanoma cell metabolic heat flow vs. time in closed ampoules were measured for 20 hours. The authors concluded that

"...microcalorimetry is a sensitive and particularly suitable method for the analysis of cytotoxicity kinetics."

IMC is also being used in environmental toxicology. In an early study (Thorén 1992) toxicity against monolayers of alveolar macrophages of particles of MnO_{2}, TiO_{2} and SiO_{2} (silica) were evaluated. IMC results were in accord with results obtained by fluorescein ester staining and microscopic image analysis—except that IMC showed toxic effects of quartz not discernable by image analysis. This latter observation—in accord with known alveolar effects—indicated to the authors that IMC was a more sensitive technique.

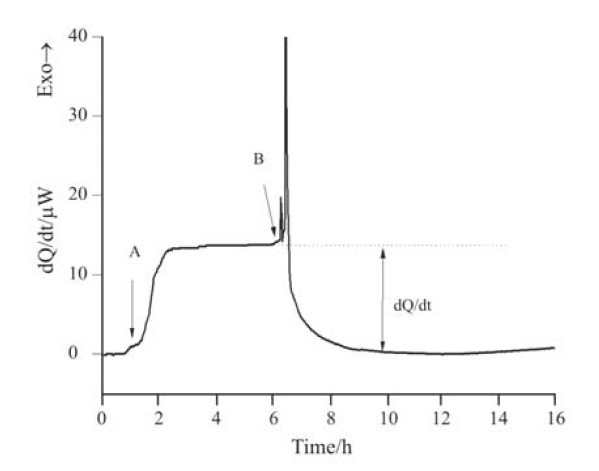
Heat flow vs. time for the treatment of fibroblasts in culture in a stirred stainless steel ampoule. A = introduction of the ampoule into the measurement position, with metabolic heat flow then reaching an equilibrium level. B = injection of sodium dodecyl sulfate (SDS) which produced sharp heat flow peaks related to exothermic dilution of the SDS and lysis of the fibroblasts. After lysis, the heat flow rate returned near zero since fibroblast metabolism had ceased. dQ/dt = the metabolic heat flow of the fibroblasts in culture (from Liu, et al. 2007 with publisher permission). Fig. 5

Much more recently (Liu et al. 2007), IMC has been shown to provide dynamic metabolic data which assess toxicity against fibroblasts of Cr(VI) from potassium chromate. Fig. 5 shows baseline results determining the metabolic heat flow from cultured fibroblasts prior to assessing the effects of Cr(VI). The authors concluded that

"Microcalorimetry appears to be a convenient and easy technique for measuring metabolic processes...in...living cells. As opposed to standard bioassay procedures, this technique allows continuous measurements of the metabolism of living cells. We have thus shown that Cr(VI) impairs metabolic pathways of human fibroblasts and particularly glucose utilization."

Simple closed ampoule IMC has also been used and advocated for assessing the cultured cell toxicity of candidate surgical implant materials—and thus serve as a biocompatibility screening method. In one study (Xie et al. 2000) porcine renal tubular cells in culture were exposed to both polymers and titanium metal in the form of "microplates" having known surface areas of a few cm^{2}. The authors concluded that IMC

"...is a rapid method, convenient to operate and with good reproducibility. The present method can in most cases replace more time-consuming light and electron microscopic investigations for quantitating of adhered cells."

In another implant materials study (Doostmohammadi et al. 2011) both a rapidly growing yeast culture and a human chondrocyte culture were exposed to particles (diameter < 50 μm) of calcium hydroxyapatite (HA) and bioactive (calcium-containing) silica glass. The glass particles slowed or curtailed yeast growth as a function of increasing particle concentration. The HA particles had much less effect and never entirely curtailed yeast growth at the same concentrations. The effects of both particle types on chondrocyte growth were minimal at the concentration employed. The authors concluded that

"The cytotoxicity of particulate materials such as bioactive glass and hydroxyapatite particles can be evaluated using the microcalorimetry method. This is a modern method for in vitro study of biomaterials biocompatibility and cytotoxicity which can be used alongside the old conventional assays."

===== Microbiology =====
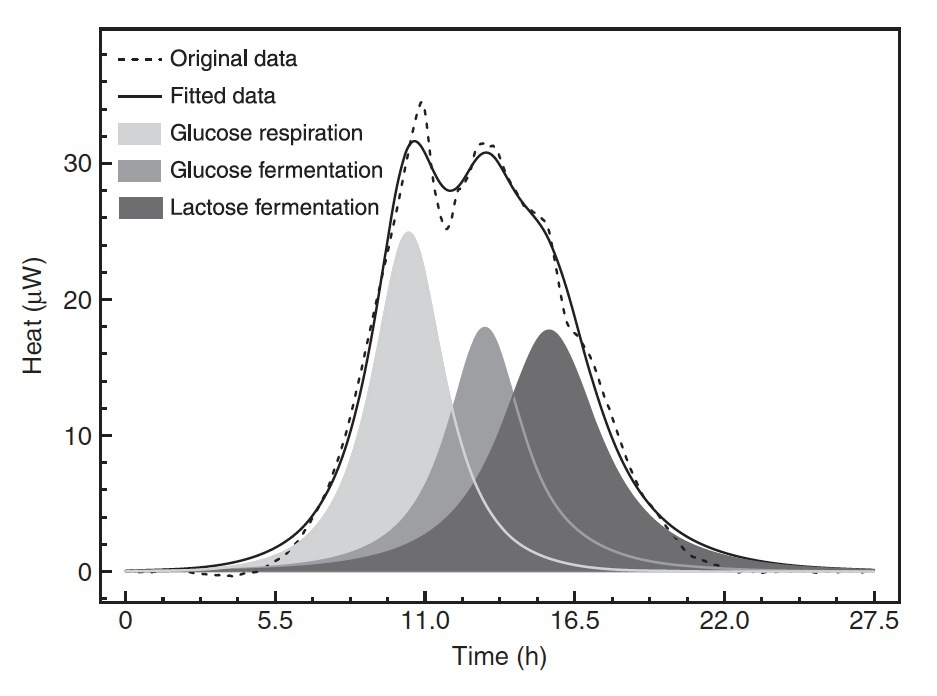
Example of how growth-related heat flow vs. time data from bacteria in culture in a given medium in a sealed ampoule reflect the sequence of metabolic activities taking place. The bacteria move on to consuming less efficient carbon sources as more efficient sources are depleted. Deconvolution of the data yielded the peaks shown which can be assigned to the metabolic modes shown. This sequence for the E. coli bacteria employed is well known in the field of microbiology (from Braissant et al. 2010 with publisher permission). Fig.6

Publications describing use of IMC in microbiology began in the 1980s (Jesperson 1982). While some IMC microbiology studies have been directed at viruses (Heng et al. 2005) and fungi (Antoci et al. 1997), most have been concerned with bacteria. A recent paper (Braissant et al. 2010) provides a general introduction to IMC metabolismic methods in microbiology and an overview of applications in medical and environmental microbiology. The paper also explains how heat flow vs. time data for bacteria in culture are an exact expression—as they occur over time—of the fluctuations in microorganism metabolic activity and replication rates in a given medium (Fig. 6).

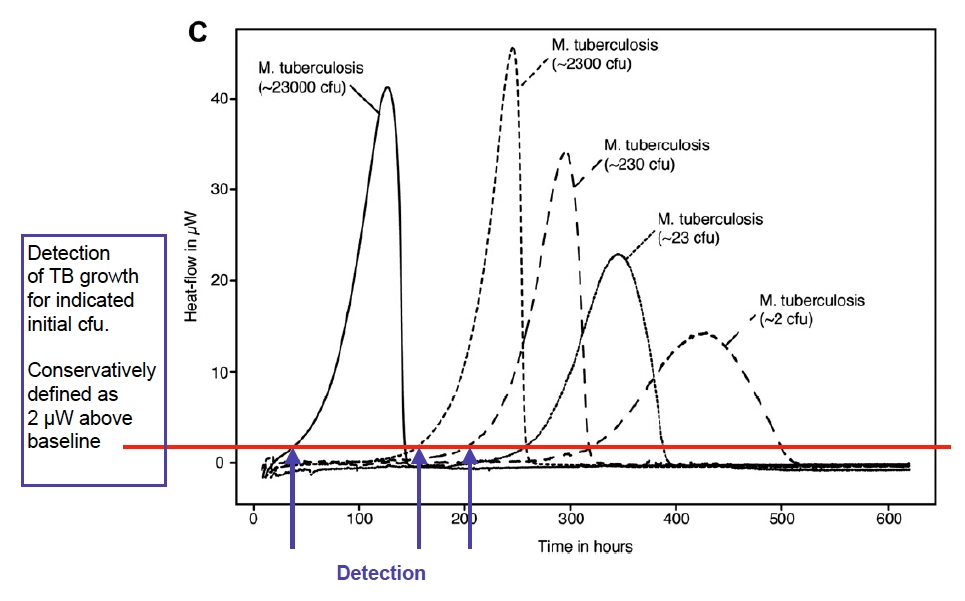
Illustration of how IMC time of detection of the presence of bacteria depends on the initial number of bacteria present (CFU), the sensitivity of the instrument and the level of heat flow above baseline that is selected as indicating bacterial growth. CFU = colony forming unit. (adapted from Braissant et al. 2010 with publisher permission). Fig.7

In general, bacteria are about 1/10 the size of mammalian cells and produce perhaps 1/10 as much metabolic heat-i.e. 3 × 10^{−12} W/cell. Thus, compared to mammalian cells (see above) 10 times as many bacteria—about 330,000—must be present to produce detectable heat flow—i.e. 1 μW. However, many bacteria replicate orders of magnitude more rapidly in culture than mammalian cells, often doubling their number in a matter of minutes (see Bacterial growth). As a result, a small initial number of bacteria in culture and initially undetectable by IMC rapidly produce a detectable number. For example, 100 bacteria doubling every 20 minutes will in less than 4 hours produce >330,000 bacteria and thus an IMC-detectable heat flow. Consequently, IMC can be used for easy, rapid detection of bacteria in the medical field. Examples include detection of bacteria in human blood platelet products (Trampuz et al. 2007) and urine (Bonkat et al. 2011) and rapid detection of tuberculosis (Braissant et al. 2010, Rodriguez et al. 2011). Fig. 7 shows an example of detection times of tuberculosis bacteria as a function of the initial amount of bacteria present in a closed IMC ampoule containing a culture medium.

For microbes in growth media in closed ampoules, IMC heat flow data can also be used to closely estimate basic microbial growth parameters; i.e. maximum growth rate and duration time of the lag phase before maximum growth rate is achieved. This is an important special application of the basic analysis of these parameters explained previously (Overview: Data Obtained).

Unfortunately, the IMC literature contains some published papers in which the relation between heat flow data and microbial growth in closed ampoules has been misunderstood. However, in 2013 an extensive clarification was published, describing (a) details of the relation between IMC heat flow data and microbial growth, (b) selection of mathematical models which describe microbial growth and (c) determination of microbial growth parameters from IMC data using these models (Braissant et al. 2013).

===== Pharmacodynamics =====
In a logical extension of the ability of IMC to detect and quantify bacterial growth, known concentrations of antibiotics can be added to bacterial culture, and IMC can then be used to quantify their effects on viability and growth. Closed ampoule IMC can easily capture basic pharmacologic information—e.g. minimum inhibitory concentration (MIC) of an antibiotic needed to stop growth of a given organism. In addition it can simultaneously provide dynamic growth parameters—lag time and maximum growth rate (see Fig. 2, Howell et al. 2011, Braissant et al. 2013), which assess mechanisms of action. Bactericidal action (see Bactericide) is indicated by an increased lag time as a function of increasing antibiotic concentration, while bacteriostatic action (see Bacteriostatic agent) is indicated by a decrease in growth rate with concentration. The IMC approach to antibiotic assessment has been demonstrated for a number of a types of bacteria and antibiotics (von Ah et al. 2009). Closed ampoule IMC can also rapidly differentiate between normal and resistant strains of bacteria such as Staphylococcus aureus (von Ah et al. 2008, Baldoni et al. 2009). IMC has also been used to assess the effects of disinfectants on the viability of mouth bacteria adhered to dental implant materials (Astasov-Frauenhoffer et al. 2011). In a related earlier study, IMC was used to measure the heat of adhesion of dental bacteria to glass (Hauser-Gerspach et al. 2008).

Analogous successful use of IMC to determine the effects of antitumor drugs on tumor cells in culture within a few hours has been demonstrated (Schön and Wadsö 1988). Rather than the closed-ampoule approach, an IMC setup was used which allowed drug injection into stirred specimens.

As of 2013, IMC has been used less widely in mammalian cell in vitro pharmacodynamic studies than in microbial studies.

===== Multicellular organisms =====
It is possible to use IMC to perform metabolismic studies of living multicellular organisms—if they are small enough to be placed in IMC ampoules (Lamprecht & Becker 1988). IMC studies have been made of insect pupa metabolism during ventilating movements (Harak et al. 1996) and effects of chemical agents on pupal growth (Kuusik et al. 1995). IMC has also proved effective in assessing the effects of aging on nematode worm metabolism (Braekman et al. 2002).

IMC has also proved highly useful for in vitro assessments of the effects of pharmaceuticals on tropical parasitic worms (Manneck et al. 2011-1, Maneck et al. 2011-2, Kirchhofer et al. 2011). An interesting feature of these studies is the use of a simple manual injection system for introducing the pharmaceuticals into sealed ampoules containing the worms. Also, IMC not only documents the general metabolic decline over time due to the drugs, but also the overall frequency of worm motor activity and its decline in amplitude over time as reflected in fluctuations in the heat flow data.

===== Environmental biology =====
Because of its versatility, IMC can be an effective tool in the fields of plant and environmental biology. In an early study (Hansen et al. 1989), the metabolic rate of larch tree clone tissue specimens was measured. The rate was predictive of long-term tree growth rates, was consistent for specimens from a given tree and was found to correlate with known variations in the long-term growth of clones from different trees.

Bacterial oxalotrophic metabolism is common in the environment, particularly in soils. Oxalotrophic bacteria are capable of using oxalate as a sole carbon and energy source. Closed-ampoule IMC was used to study metabolism of oxalotrophic soil bacteria exposed to both an optimized medium containing potassium oxalate as the sole carbon source and a model soil (Bravo et al. 2011). Using an optimized medium, growth of six different strains of soil bacteria was easily monitored and reproducibly quantified and differentiated over a period days. IMC measurement of bacterial metabolic heat flow in the model soil was more difficult, but a proof of concept was demonstrated.

Moonmilk is a white, creamy material found in caves. It is a non-hardening, fine crystalline precipitate from limestone and is composed mainly of calcium and/or magnesium carbonates. Microbes may be involved in its formation. It is difficult to infer microbial activities in moonmilk from standard static chemical and microscopic assays of moonmilk composition and structure. Closed ampoule IMC has been used to solve this problem (Braissant, Bindscheidler et al. 2011). It was possible to determine the growth rates of chemoheterotrophic microbial communities on moonmilk after the addition of various carbon sources simulating mixes that would be brought into contact with moonmilk due to snow melt or rainfall. Metabolic activity was high and comparable to that found in some soils.

Harris et al. (2012), studying differing fertilizer input regimes, found that, when expressed as heat output per unit soil microbial biomass, microbial communities under organic fertilizer regimes produced less waste heat than those under inorganic regimes.

===== Food science =====
IMC has been shown to have diverse uses in food science and technology. An overview (Wadsö and Galindo 2009) discusses successful applications in assessing vegetable cutting wound respiration, cell death from blanching, milk fermentation, microbiological spoilage prevention, thermal treatment and shelf life. Another publication (Galindo et al. 2005) reviews the successful use of IMC for monitoring and predicting quality changes during storage of minimally processed fruits and vegetables.

IMC has also proven effective in accomplishing enzymatic assays for orotic acid in milk (Anastasi et al. 2000) and malic acid in fruits, wines and other beverages and also cosmetic products (Antonelli et al. 2008). IMC has also been used to assess the efficacy of anti-browning agents on fresh-cut potatoes (Rocculi et al. 2007). IMC has also proven effective in assessing the extent to which low-energy pulsed electric fields (PEFs) affect the heat of germination of barley seeds—important in connection with their use in producing malted beverages (Dymek et al. 2012).

== See also ==
- Calorimetry
- Chemical thermodynamics
- Differential scanning calorimetry
- Isothermal titration calorimetry
- Rate equation
- Sorption calorimetry
- Thermal analysis
- Thermoelectric effect

== Bibliography ==
- Harris, JA; Ritz, K; Coucheney, E; Grice, SM; Lerch, TZ; Pawlett, M; Herrmann, AM (2012). "The thermodynamic efficiency of soil microbial communities subject to long-term stress is lower than those under conventional input regimes". Soil Biology & Biochemistry. 47: 149–157. Bibcode:2012SBiBi..47..149H. doi:10.1016/j.soilbio.2011.12.017.
- Glasstone S, Laidler KJ, Eyring H (1941) The theory of rate processes: the kinetics of chemical reactions, viscosity, diffusion and electrochemical phenomena. McGraw-Hill (New York). 611p.
- Johnson FH, Eyring H, Stover BJ (1974) The theory of rate processes in biology and medicine. Wiley (New York), ISBN 0-471-44485-5, 703p.
- Lavoisier A & Laplace PS (1780) M´emoire sur la chaleur. Académie des Sciences, Paris.
- Brown ME, Editor (1998) Vol. 1 Principles and Practice (691p.), in Handbook of Thermal Analysis and Calorimetry. Gallagher PK (Series Editor). Elsevier (London).
- Brown ME and Gallagher PK, Editors (2003) Vol. 2 Applications to Inorganic and Miscellaneous Materials (905p.), in Handbook of Thermal Analysis and Calorimetry. Gallagher PK (Series Editor). Elsevier (London). ISBN 978-0-444-82086-0
- Cheng SZD, Editor (2002) Vol. 3 Applications to Polymers and Plastics (828p.) in Handbook of Thermal Analysis and Calorimetry. Gallagher PK (Series Editor). Elsevier (London).
- Kemp RB, Editor (1999) Vol. 4 From Macromolecules to Man (1032p.), in Handbook of Thermal Analysis and Calorimetry. Gallagher PK (Series Editor). Elsevier (London).
- Microcalorimetry Compendium Vol. 1: Proteins, Life & Biological Sciences, Pharmaceuticals (2009). TA Instruments, Inc. (New Castle DE, USA).
- Microcalorimetry Compendium Vol. 2: Cement, Energetics, Material, Other (2009). TA Instruments, Inc. (New Castle DE, USA).
- West, GB; Woodruff, WH; Brown, JH (2002). "Allometric scaling of metabolic rate from molecules and mitochondria to cells and mammals". PNAS. 99 (Suppl 1): 2473–2478. Bibcode:2002PNAS...99.2473W. doi:10.1073/pnas.012579799. PMC 128563. PMID 11875197.
