= Exergonic and endergonic reaction =

For exergonic and endergonic reactions, see the separate articles:

- Endergonic reaction
- Exergonic reaction

== See also ==
- Exergonic process
- Endergonic
- Exothermic process
- Endothermic process
