= Product (chemistry) =

Species formed from chemical reactions

The reaction products of the combustion of methane are carbon dioxide and water.

Products are the chemical species formed from chemical reactions. During a chemical reaction, reactants are transformed into products after passing through a high energy transition state. This process results in the consumption of the reactants. It can be a spontaneous reaction or mediated by catalysts which lower the energy of the transition state, and by solvents which provide the chemical environment necessary for the reaction to take place. When represented in chemical equations, products are by convention drawn on the right-hand side, even in the case of reversible reactions. The properties of products such as their energies help determine several characteristics of a chemical reaction, such as whether the reaction is exergonic or endergonic. Additionally, the properties of a product can make it easier to extract and purify following a chemical reaction, especially if the product has a different state of matter than the reactants.

Spontaneous reaction

$$R \rightarrow P$$

- Where R is reactant and P is product.

Catalysed reaction

$$R + C \rightarrow P + C$$

- Where R is reactant, P is product and C is catalyst.

Much of chemistry research is focused on the synthesis and characterization of beneficial products, as well as the detection and removal of undesirable products. Synthetic chemists can be subdivided into research chemists who design new chemicals and pioneer new methods for synthesizing chemicals, as well as process chemists who scale up chemical production and make it safer, more environmentally sustainable, and more efficient. Other fields include natural product chemists who isolate products created by living organisms and then characterize and study these products.

== Determination of reaction ==
The products of a chemical reaction influence several aspects of the reaction. If the products are lower in energy than the reactants, then the reaction will give off excess energy making it an exergonic reaction. Such reactions are thermodynamically favorable and tend to happen on their own. If the kinetics of the reaction are high enough, however, then the reaction may occur too slowly to be observed, or not even occur at all. This is the case with the conversion of diamond to lower energy graphite at atmospheric pressure, in such a reaction diamond is considered metastable and will not be observed converting into graphite.

If the products are higher in chemical energy than the reactants then the reaction will require energy to be performed and is therefore an endergonic reaction. Additionally if the product is less stable than a reactant, then Leffler's assumption holds that the transition state will more closely resemble the product than the reactant. Sometimes the product will differ significantly enough from the reactant that it is easily purified following the reaction such as when a product is insoluble and precipitates out of solution while the reactants remained dissolved.

== History ==
Ever since the mid-nineteenth century, chemists have been increasingly preoccupied with synthesizing chemical products. Disciplines focused on isolation and characterization of products, such as natural products chemists, remain important to the field, and the combination of their contributions alongside synthetic chemists has resulted in much of the framework through which chemistry is understood today.

Much of synthetic chemistry is concerned with the synthesis of new chemicals as occurs in the design and creation of new drugs, as well as the discovery of new synthetic techniques. Beginning in the early 2000s, process chemistry began emerging as a distinct field of synthetic chemistry focused on scaling up chemical synthesis to industrial levels, as well as finding ways to make these processes more efficient, safer, and environmentally responsible.

== Biochemistry ==
Conversion of the disaccharide sugar lactose (substrate) to two monosaccharide sugars (products) by lactase (enzyme)

In biochemistry, enzymes act as biological catalysts to convert substrate to product. For example, the products of the enzyme lactase are galactose and glucose, which are produced from the substrate lactose.

$$S + E \rightarrow P + E$$

- Where S is substrate, P is product and E is enzyme.

=== Product promiscuity ===
Some enzymes display a form of promiscuity where they convert a single substrate into multiple different products. It occurs when the reaction occurs via a high energy transition state that can be resolved into a variety of different chemical products.

=== Product inhibition ===
Some enzymes are inhibited by the product of their reaction binds to the enzyme and reduces its activity. This can be important in the regulation of metabolism as a form of negative feedback controlling metabolic pathways. Product inhibition is also an important topic in biotechnology, as overcoming this effect can increase the yield of a product.

== See also ==
- Chemical reaction
  - Substrate
  - Reagent
    - Precursor
  - catalyst
  - Enzyme
  - Product
    - Derivative
- Chemical equilibrium
- Second law of thermodynamics
