= Activation energy =

Minimum energy required for a chemical reaction

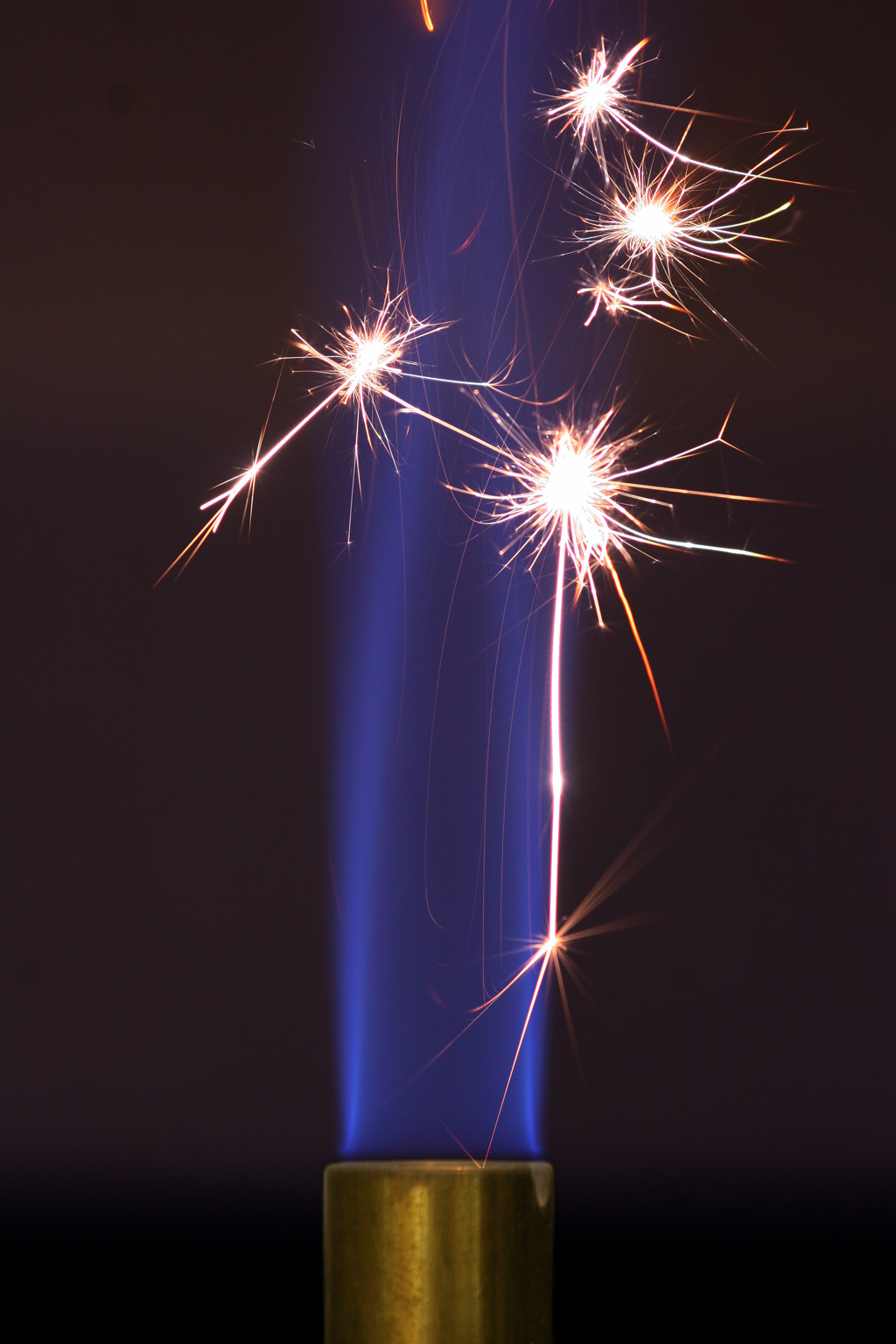
The sparks created by striking steel against a piece of flint provide the activation energy to initiate combustion in this Bunsen burner. The blue flame sustains itself after the sparks stop because the continued combustion of the flame is now energetically favorable.

In the Arrhenius model of reaction rates, activation energy is the minimum amount of energy that must be available to reactants for a chemical reaction to occur. The activation energy (E_{a}) of a reaction is measured in kilojoules per mole (kJ/mol) or kilocalories per mole (kcal/mol). Simplified:

Activation energy is the minimum energy barrier that reactant molecules must overcome to transform into products. A reaction occurs only if enough molecules have kinetic energy equal to or greater than this barrier, which usually requires sufficiently high temperature. The term "activation energy" was introduced in 1889 by the Swedish scientist Svante Arrhenius.

== Other uses ==
Although less commonly used, activation energy also applies to nuclear reactions and various other physical phenomena.

== Temperature dependence and the relation to the Arrhenius equation ==
The Arrhenius equation gives the quantitative basis of the relationship between the activation energy and the rate at which a reaction proceeds. From the equation, the activation energy can be found through the relation
$$k = A e^{{-E_\textrm{a}}/{(RT)}}$$

where A is the pre-exponential factor for the reaction, R is the universal gas constant, T is the absolute temperature (usually in kelvins), and k is the reaction rate coefficient. Even without knowing A, E_{a} can be evaluated from the variation in reaction rate coefficients as a function of temperature (within the validity of the Arrhenius equation).

At a more advanced level, the net Arrhenius activation energy term from the Arrhenius equation is best regarded as an experimentally determined parameter that indicates the sensitivity of the reaction rate to temperature. There are two objections to associating this activation energy with the threshold barrier for an elementary reaction. First, it is often unclear as to whether or not reaction does proceed in one step; threshold barriers that are averaged out over all elementary steps have little theoretical value. Second, even if the reaction being studied is elementary, a spectrum of individual collisions contributes to rate constants obtained from bulk ('bulb') experiments involving billions of molecules, with many different reactant collision geometries and angles, different translational and (possibly) vibrational energies—all of which may lead to different microscopic reaction rates.

== Catalysts ==
Example of an enzyme-catalysed exothermic reaction

The relationship between activation energy ($E_\textrm{a}$) and enthalpy of reaction (ΔH) with and without a catalyst, plotted against the reaction coordinate. The highest energy position (peak position) represents the transition state. With the catalyst, the energy required to enter transition state decreases, thereby decreasing the energy required to initiate the reaction.

A substance that modifies the transition state to lower the activation energy is termed a catalyst; a catalyst composed only of protein and (if applicable) small molecule cofactors is termed an enzyme. A catalyst increases the rate of reaction without being consumed in the reaction. In addition, the catalyst lowers the activation energy, but it does not change the energies of the original reactants or products, and so does not change equilibrium. Rather, the reactant energy and the product energy remain the same and only the activation energy is altered (lowered).

A catalyst is able to reduce the activation energy by forming a transition state in a more favorable manner. Catalysts, by nature, create a more "comfortable" fit for the substrate of a reaction to progress to a transition state. This is possible due to a release of energy that occurs when the substrate binds to the active site of a catalyst. This energy is known as Binding Energy. Upon binding to a catalyst, substrates partake in numerous stabilizing forces while within the active site (e.g. hydrogen bonding or van der Waals forces). Specific and favorable bonding occurs within the active site until the substrate forms to become the high-energy transition state. Forming the transition state is more favorable with the catalyst because the favorable stabilizing interactions within the active site release energy. A chemical reaction is able to manufacture a high-energy transition state molecule more readily when there is a stabilizing fit within the active site of a catalyst. The binding energy of a reaction is this energy released when favorable interactions between substrate and catalyst occur. The binding energy released assists in achieving the unstable transition state. Reactions without catalysts need a higher input of energy to achieve the transition state. Non-catalyzed reactions do not have free energy available from active site stabilizing interactions, such as catalytic enzyme reactions.

== Relationship with Gibbs energy of activation ==
In the Arrhenius equation, the term activation energy (E_{a}) is used to describe the energy required to reach the transition state, and the exponential relationship k = A exp(−E_{a}/RT) holds. In transition state theory, a more sophisticated model of the relationship between reaction rates and the transition state, a superficially similar mathematical relationship, the Eyring equation, is used to describe the rate constant of a reaction: k = (k_{B}T / h) exp(−ΔG^{‡} / RT). However, instead of modeling the temperature dependence of reaction rate phenomenologically, the Eyring equation models individual elementary steps of a reaction. Thus, for a multistep process, there is no straightforward relationship between the two models. Nevertheless, the functional forms of the Arrhenius and Eyring equations are similar, and for a one-step process, simple and chemically meaningful correspondences can be drawn between Arrhenius and Eyring parameters.

Instead of also using E_{a}, the Eyring equation uses the concept of Gibbs energy and the symbol ΔG^{‡} to denote the Gibbs energy of activation to achieve the transition state. In the equation, k_{B} and h are the Boltzmann and Planck constants, respectively. Although the equations look similar, the Gibbs energy contains an entropic term in addition to the enthalpic one. In the Arrhenius equation, this entropic term is accounted for by the pre-exponential factor A. More specifically, we can write the Gibbs free energy of activation in terms of enthalpy and entropy of activation: ΔG^{‡} = ΔH^{‡} − T ΔS^{‡}. Then, for a unimolecular, one-step reaction, the approximate relationships E_{a} = ΔH^{‡} + RT and A = (k_{B}T/h) exp(1 + ΔS^{‡}/R) hold. Note, however, that in Arrhenius theory proper, A is temperature independent, while here, there is a linear dependence on T. For a one-step unimolecular process whose half-life at room temperature is about 2 hours, ΔG^{‡} is approximately 23 kcal/mol. This is also the roughly the magnitude of E_{a} for a reaction that proceeds over several hours at room temperature. Due to the relatively small magnitude of TΔS^{‡} and RT at ordinary temperatures for most reactions, in sloppy discourse, E_{a}, ΔG^{‡}, and ΔH^{‡} are often conflated and all referred to as the "activation energy".

The enthalpy, entropy and Gibbs energy of activation are more correctly written as Δ^{‡}H^{o}, Δ^{‡}S^{o} and Δ^{‡}G^{o} respectively, where the o indicates a quantity evaluated between standard states. However, some authors omit the o in order to simplify the notation.

The total free energy change of a reaction is independent of the activation energy however. Physical and chemical reactions can be either exergonic or endergonic, but the activation energy is not related to the spontaneity of a reaction. The overall reaction energy change is not altered by the activation energy.

== Negative activation energy ==
In some cases, rates of reaction decrease with increasing temperature. When following an approximately exponential relationship so the rate constant can still be fit to an Arrhenius expression, this results in a negative value of E_{a}.

Elementary reactions exhibiting negative activation energies are typically barrierless reactions, in which the reaction proceeding relies on the capture of the molecules in a potential well. Increasing the temperature leads to a reduced probability of the colliding molecules capturing one another (with more glancing collisions not leading to reaction as the higher momentum carries the colliding particles out of the potential well), expressed as a reaction cross section that decreases with increasing temperature. Such a situation no longer leads itself to direct interpretations as the height of a potential barrier.

Some multistep reactions can also have apparent negative activation energies. For example, the overall rate constant k for a two-step reaction A ⇌ B, B → C is given by k = k_{2}K_{1}, where k_{2} is the rate constant of the rate-limiting slow second step and K_{1} is the equilibrium constant of the rapid first step. In some reactions, K_{1} decreases with temperature more rapidly than k_{2} increases, so that k actually decreases with temperature corresponding to a negative observed activation energy.

An example is the oxidation of nitric oxide which is a termolecular reaction $\ce{2 NO + O2 -> 2 NO2}$. The rate law is $v = k \, \left[ {\rm NO} \right]^2 \, \left[ {\rm O_2} \right]$ with a negative activation energy. This is explained by the two-step mechanism: $\ce{2 NO <=> N2O2}$ and $\ce{N2O2 + O2 -> 2 NO2}$.

Certain cationic polymerization reactions have negative activation energies so that the rate decreases with temperature. For chain-growth polymerization, the overall activation energy is $\textstyle E = E_i + E_p - E_t$, where i, p and t refer respectively to initiation, propagation and termination steps. The propagation step normally has a very small activation energy, so that the overall value is negative if the activation energy for termination is larger than that for initiation. The normal range of overall activation energies for cationic polymerization varies from 40 to 60 kJ/mol.

== See also ==
- Activation energy asymptotics
- Chemical kinetics
- Mean kinetic temperature
- Autoignition temperature
- Quantum tunnelling
