= Exothermic reaction =

Chemical reaction releasing energy as light or heat

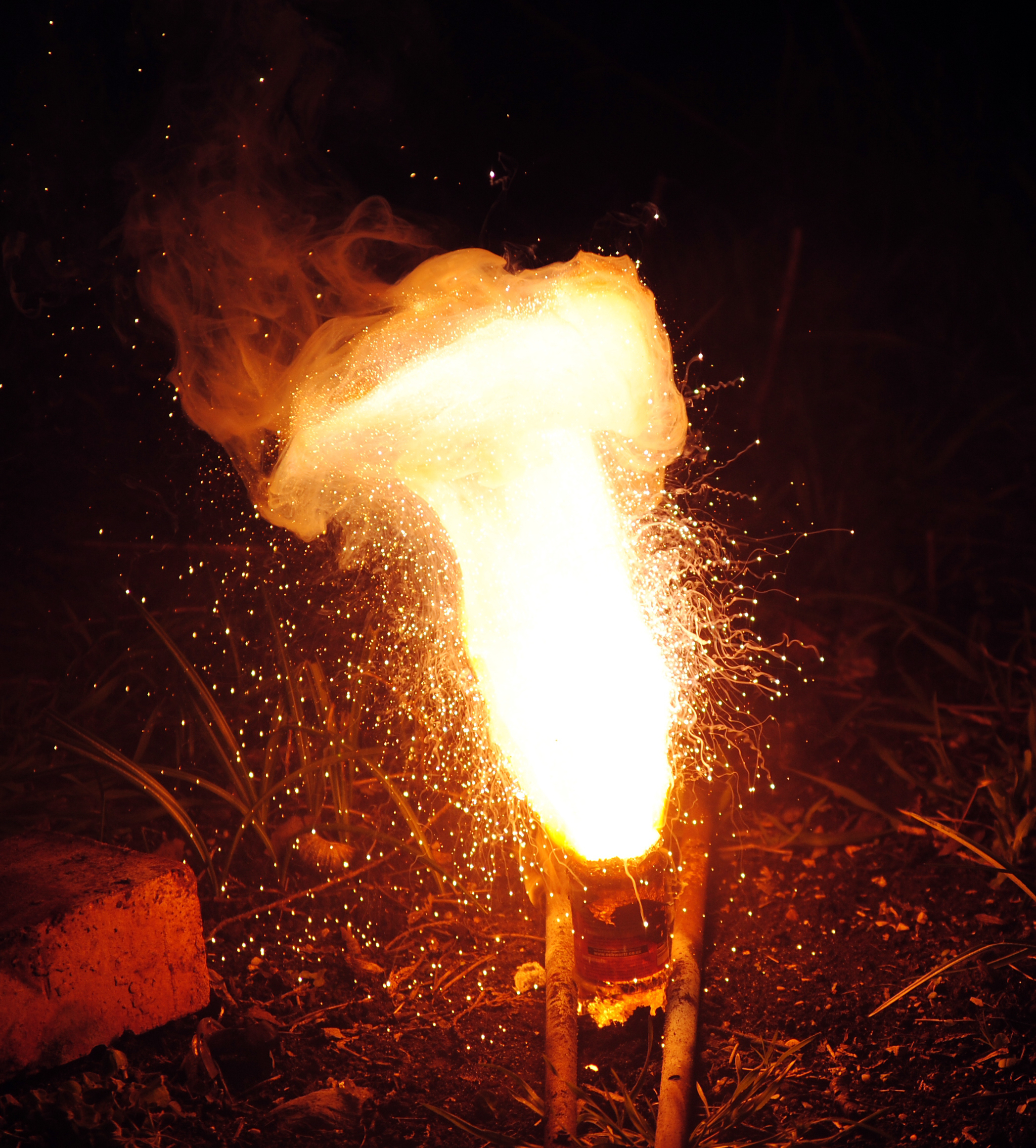
The thermite reaction is famously exothermic. The reduction of iron(III) oxide by aluminium releases sufficient heat to yield molten iron.

In thermochemistry, an exothermic reaction is a "reaction for which the overall standard enthalpy change ΔH⚬ is negative." Exothermic reactions usually release stored energy as heat. The term is often confused with exergonic reaction, which IUPAC defines as "... a reaction for which the overall standard Gibbs energy change ΔG^{⚬} is negative." A strongly exothermic reaction will usually also be exergonic because ΔH^{⚬} makes a major contribution to ΔG^{⚬}. Most of the spectacular chemical reactions that are demonstrated in classrooms are exothermic and exergonic. The opposite is an endothermic reaction, which usually takes up heat and is driven by an entropy increase in the system.

== Examples ==
Examples are numerous: combustion, the thermite reaction, combining strong acids and bases, polymerizations. As an example in everyday life, hand warmers make use of the oxidation of iron to achieve an exothermic reaction:

4Fe + 3O_{2} → 2Fe_{2}O_{3} ΔH^{⚬} = −1648 kJ/mol

A particularly important class of exothermic reactions is combustion of a hydrocarbon fuel, e.g. the burning of natural gas:

CH_{4} + 2O_{2} → CO_{2} + 2H_{2}O ΔH^{⚬} = −890 kJ/mol

Video of an exothermic reaction. Ethanol vapor is ignited inside a bottle, causing combustion.

These sample reactions are strongly exothermic.

Uncontrolled exothermic reactions, those leading to fires and explosions, are wasteful because it is difficult to capture the released energy. Nature effects combustion reactions under highly controlled conditions, avoiding fires and explosions, in aerobic respiration so as to capture the released energy, e.g. for the formation of ATP.

== Measurement ==
The enthalpy of a chemical system is essentially its energy. The enthalpy change ΔH for a reaction is equal to the heat q transferred out of (or into) a closed system at constant pressure without in- or output of electrical energy. Heat production or absorption in a chemical reaction is measured using calorimetry, e.g. with a bomb calorimeter. One common laboratory instrument is the reaction calorimeter, where the heat flow from or into the reaction vessel is monitored. The heat release and corresponding energy change, ΔH, of a combustion reaction can be measured particularly accurately.

The measured heat energy released in an exothermic reaction is converted to ΔH^{⚬} in Joule per mole (formerly cal/mol). The standard enthalpy change ΔH^{⚬} is essentially the enthalpy change when the stoichiometric coefficients in the reaction are considered as the amounts of reactants and products (in mole); usually, the initial and final temperature is assumed to be 25 °C. For gas-phase reactions, ΔH^{⚬} values are related to bond energies to a good approximation by:

ΔH^{⚬} = (total bond energy of reactants) − (total bond energy of products)

An energy profile of an exothermic reaction

In an exothermic reaction, by definition, the enthalpy change has a negative value:

ΔH = H_{products} − H_{reactants} < 0

where a larger value (the higher energy of the reactants) is subtracted from a smaller value (the lower energy of the products). For example, when hydrogen burns:

2H_{2} (g) + O_{2} (g) → 2H_{2}O (g)
ΔH^{⚬} = −483.6 kJ/mol

== See also ==
- Chemical thermodynamics
- Differential scanning calorimetry
- Endergonic
- Exergonic
- Endergonic reaction
- Exergonic reaction
- Exothermic process
- Endothermic reaction
- Endotherm
