= Room temperature =

Range of indoor air temperatures preferred by most people

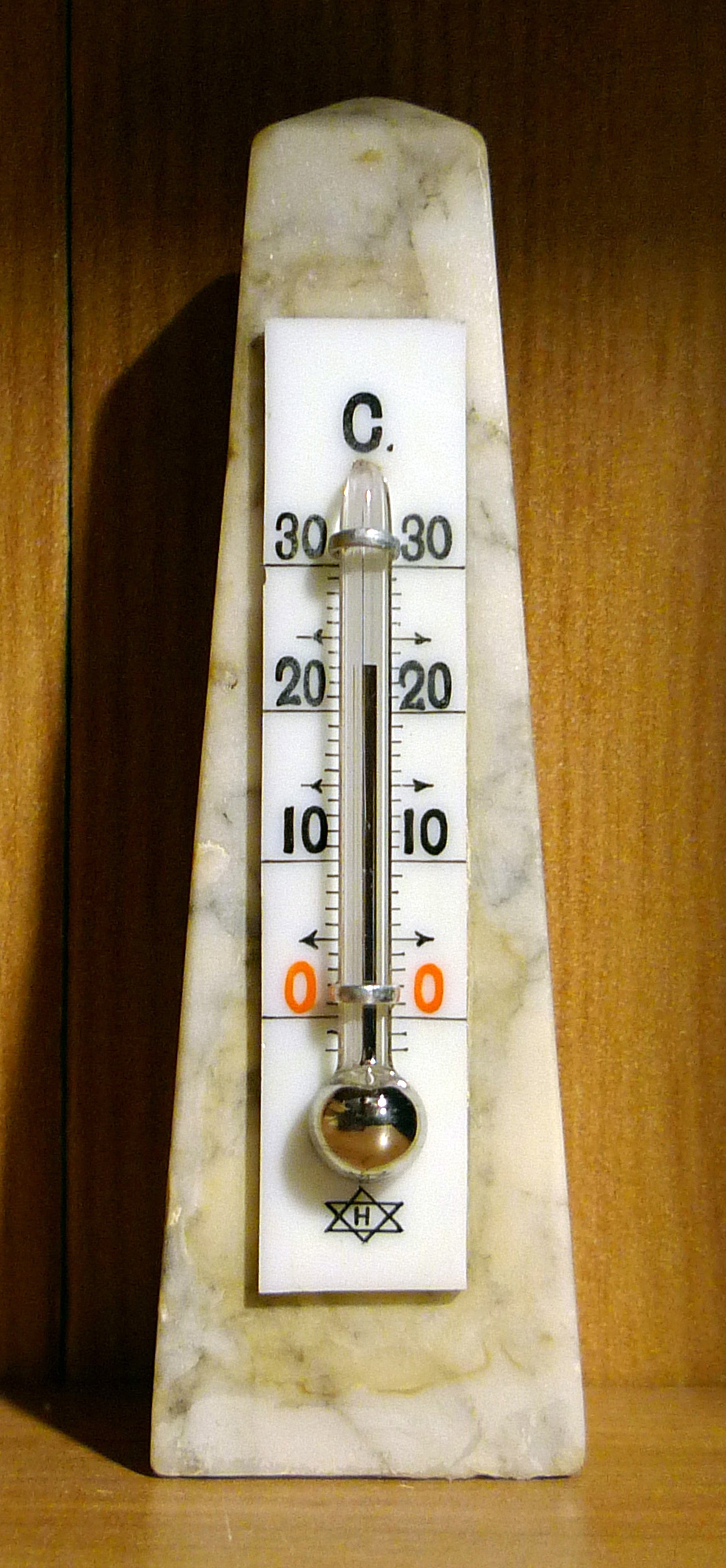
Mercury-in-glass thermometer measuring an ambient temperature of 23 °C (73 °F) a little above the normal "room temperature" range

Room temperature, colloquially, denotes the range of air temperatures most people find comfortable indoors while dressed in typical clothing. Comfortable temperatures can be extended beyond this range depending on humidity and air circulation, among other factors.

In certain fields, like science and engineering, and within a particular context, room temperature can mean different agreed-upon ranges. In contrast, ambient temperature is the actual temperature, as measured by a thermometer, of the air (or other medium and surroundings) in any particular place. The ambient temperature (e.g. an unheated room in winter) may be very different from an ideal room temperature.

Food and beverages may be served at "room temperature", meaning neither heated nor cooled.

== Comfort temperatures ==
Comfort temperature is interchangeable with neutral temperature in the scientific literature, which can be calculated through regression analysis between thermal sensation votes and indoor temperature. The neutral temperature is the solution of the resulting regression model by setting the thermal sensation vote as zero. The American Heritage Dictionary of the English Language identifies room temperature as around 20–22 °C (68–72 °F; 293–295 K), while the Oxford English Dictionary states that it is "conventionally taken as about 20 °C (68 °F; 293 K)".

Ideal room temperature varies vastly depending on the surrounding climate. Studies from Indonesia have shown that the range of comfortable temperature is 24–29 °C (75–84 °F) for local residents. Studies from Nigeria show a comfortable temperature range of 26–28 °C (79–82 °F), comfortably cool 24–26 °C (75–79 °F) and comfortably warm 28–30 °C (82–86 °F). A field study conducted in Hyderabad, India returned a comfort band of 26–32.45 °C (79–90 °F) with a mean of 29.23 °C (85 °F). A study conducted in Jaipur, India among healthy young men showed that the neutral thermal comfort temperature was analyzed to be 30.15 °C (86 °F), although a range of 25.9–33.8 °C (79–93 °F) was found.

People are highly sensitive to even small differences in environmental temperature. At 24 °C (75 °F), a difference of 0.38 °C (0.68 °F) can be detected between the temperature of two rooms.

Owing to variations in humidity and (likely) clothing, recommendations for summer and winter may vary; a suggested typical range for summer is 23–25.5 °C (73–78 °F), with that for winter being 20–23.5 °C (68–74 °F). Some studies have suggested that thermal comfort preferences of men and women may differ significantly, with women on average preferring higher ambient temperatures.

Rooms may be maintained at an ambient temperature above the comfort temperature in hot weather, or below it in cold weather, if required by cost considerations or practical issues (e.g. lack of air conditioning or relatively high expense of heating). In the recent past, it was common for winter house temperatures to be kept below the comfort level; a 1978 UK study found average indoor home temperatures to be 15.8 °C (60.4 °F) while Japan in 1980 had median home temperatures of 13 °C (55 °F) to 15 °C (59 °F).

== Health effects ==
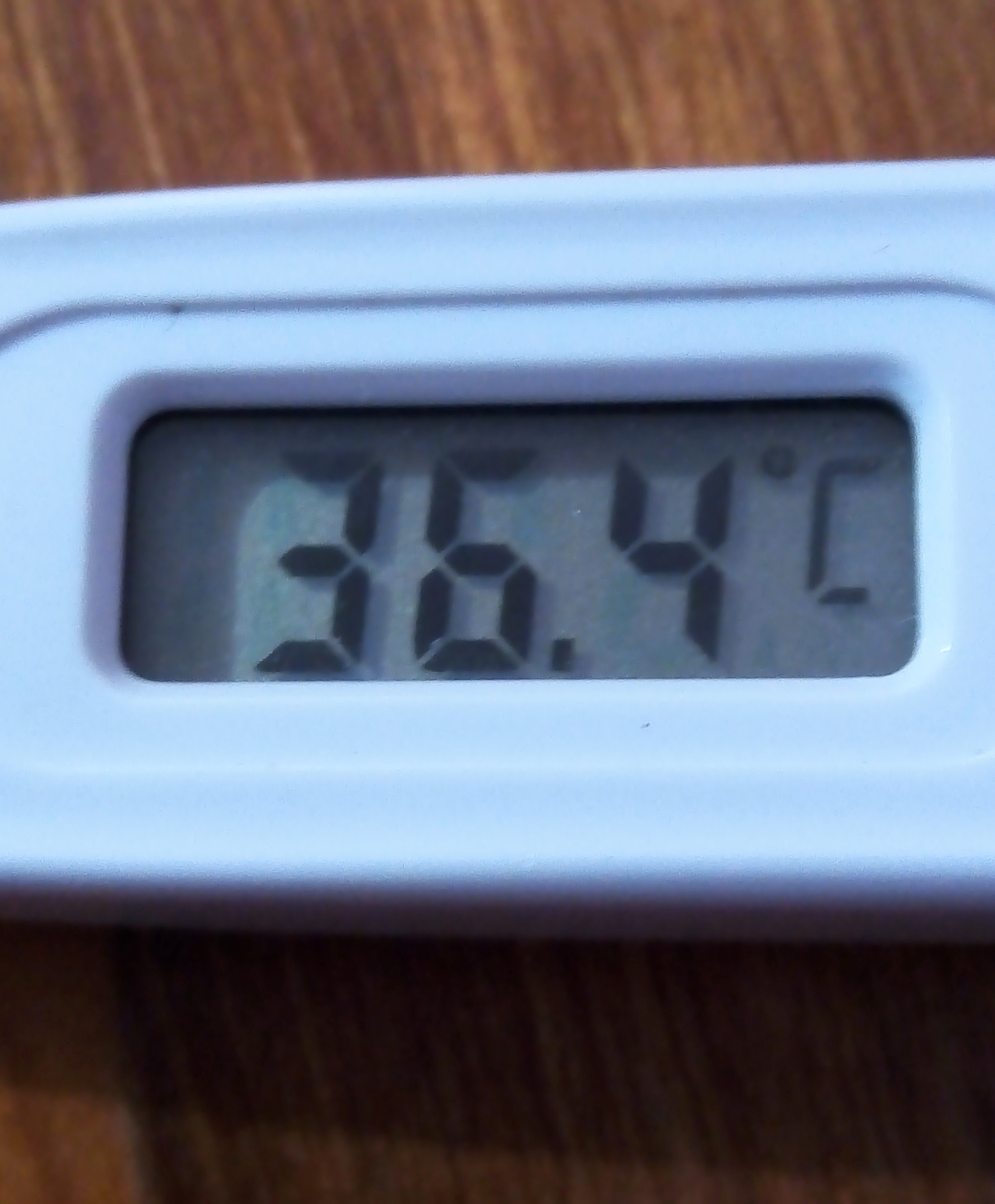
A digital thermometer reading an ambient temperature of 36.4°C (97°F) in an unventilated room during a heat wave; a high indoor temperature can cause heat exhaustion or heat stroke in a person.

The World Health Organization in 1987 found that comfortable indoor temperatures of 18–24 °C (64–75 °F) were not associated with health risks for healthy adults with appropriate clothing, humidity, and other factors. For infants, elderly, and those with significant health problems, a minimum of 20 °C (68 °F) was recommended. Temperatures lower than 16 °C (61 °F) with humidity above 65% were associated with respiratory hazards including allergies.

The WHO's 2018 guidelines give a strong recommendation that a minimum of 18 °C (64 °F) is a "safe and well-balanced indoor temperature to protect the health of general populations during cold seasons". A higher minimum temperature may be necessary for vulnerable groups including children, the elderly, and people with cardiorespiratory disease and other chronic illnesses. However, the recommendation regarding risk of exposure to high indoor temperatures is only "conditional". Minimal-risk high temperatures range from about 21 to 30 °C (70 to 86 °F) depending on the region, with maximum acceptable temperatures between 25 and 32 °C (77 and 90 °F).

== Definitions in science and industry ==
Temperature ranges are defined as room temperature for certain products and processes in industry, science, standards, and consumer goods. For instance, for the shipping and storage of pharmaceuticals, the United States Pharmacopeia-National Formulary (USP-NF) defines controlled room temperature as between 20 and 25 °C (68 and 77 °F), with excursions between 15 and 30 °C (59 and 86 °F) allowed, provided the mean kinetic temperature does not exceed 25 °C (77 °F). The European Pharmacopoeia defines it as being simply 15 to 25 °C (59 to 77 °F), and the Japanese Pharmacopeia defines "ordinary temperature" as 15 to 25 °C (59 to 77 °F), with room temperature being 1 to 30 °C (34 to 86 °F). Merriam-Webster gives as a medical definition a range of 15 to 25 °C (59 to 77 °F) as being suitable for human occupancy, and at which laboratory experiments are usually performed.

In physics and chemistry, room temperature usually refers to the ambient temperature in the laboratory; for calculations one frequently assumes 20 °C, 25 °C or 300 K (26.85 °C).

== See also ==
- Standard temperature and pressure
- ISO 1 – ISO standard temperature, 20°C
- Indoor air quality
