= Exothermic process =

Thermodynamic process that releases energy to its surroundings

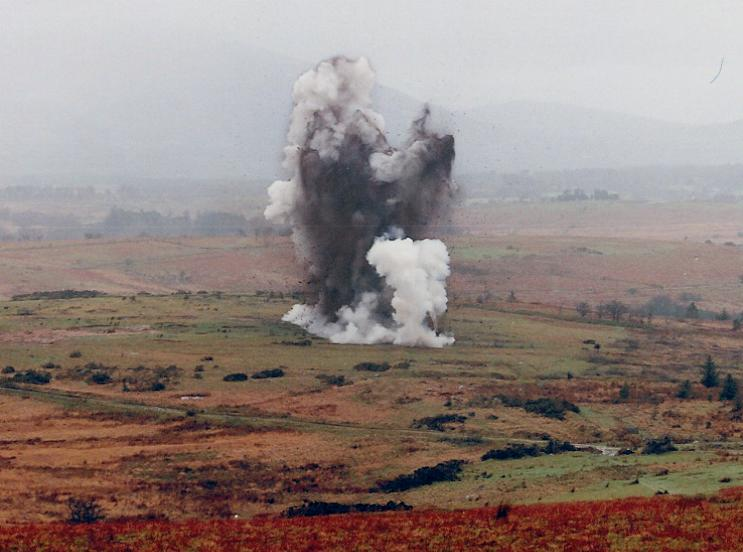
Explosions are some of the most violent exothermic reactions.

In thermodynamics, an exothermic process (from Ancient Greek έξω (éxō) 'outward' and θερμικός (thermikós) 'thermal') is a thermodynamic process or reaction that releases energy from the system to its surroundings, usually in the form of heat, but also in a form of light (e.g. a spark, flame, or flash), electricity (e.g. a battery), or sound (e.g. explosion heard when burning hydrogen). The term exothermic was coined by 19th-century French chemist Marcellin Berthelot.

The opposite of an exothermic process is an endothermic process, one that absorbs energy, usually in the form of heat. The concept is frequently applied in the physical sciences to chemical reactions where chemical bond energy is converted to thermal energy (heat).

== Two types of chemical reactions ==
Exothermic and endothermic describe two types of chemical reactions or systems found in nature, as follows:

=== Exothermic ===
An exothermic reaction occurs when heat is released to the surroundings. According to the IUPAC, an exothermic reaction is "a reaction for which the overall standard enthalpy change ΔH° is negative". Some examples of exothermic process are fuel combustion, condensation and nuclear fission, which is used in nuclear power plants to release large amounts of energy.

=== Endothermic ===
In an endothermic reaction or system, energy is taken from the surroundings in the course of the reaction, usually driven by a favorable entropy increase in the system. An example of an endothermic reaction is a first aid cold pack, in which the reaction of two chemicals, or dissolving of one in another, requires calories from the surroundings, and the reaction cools the pouch and surroundings by absorbing heat from them.

Photosynthesis, the process that allows plants to convert carbon dioxide and water to sugar and oxygen, is an endothermic process: plants absorb radiant energy from the sun and use it in an endothermic, otherwise non-spontaneous process. The chemical energy stored can be freed by the inverse (spontaneous) process: combustion of sugar, which gives carbon dioxide, water and heat (radiant energy).

== Energy release ==
Exothermic refers to a transformation in which a closed system releases energy (heat) to the surroundings, expressed by

$$Q > 0.$$

When the transformation occurs at constant pressure and without exchange of electrical energy, heat Q is equal to the enthalpy change, i.e.

$\Delta H < 0,$

While at constant volume, according to the first law of thermodynamics it equals internal energy (U) change, i.e.

$$\Delta U = Q + 0 > 0.$$

In an adiabatic system (i.e. a system that does not exchange heat with the surroundings), an otherwise exothermic process results in an increase in temperature of the system.

In exothermic chemical reactions, the heat that is released by the reaction takes the form of electromagnetic energy or kinetic energy of molecules. The transition of electrons from one quantum energy level to another causes light to be released. This light is equivalent in energy to some of the stabilization energy of the energy for the chemical reaction, i.e. the bond energy. This light that is released can be absorbed by other molecules in solution to give rise to molecular translations and rotations, which gives rise to the classical understanding of heat. In an exothermic reaction, the activation energy (energy needed to start the reaction) is less than the energy that is subsequently released, so there is a net release of energy.

== Examples ==
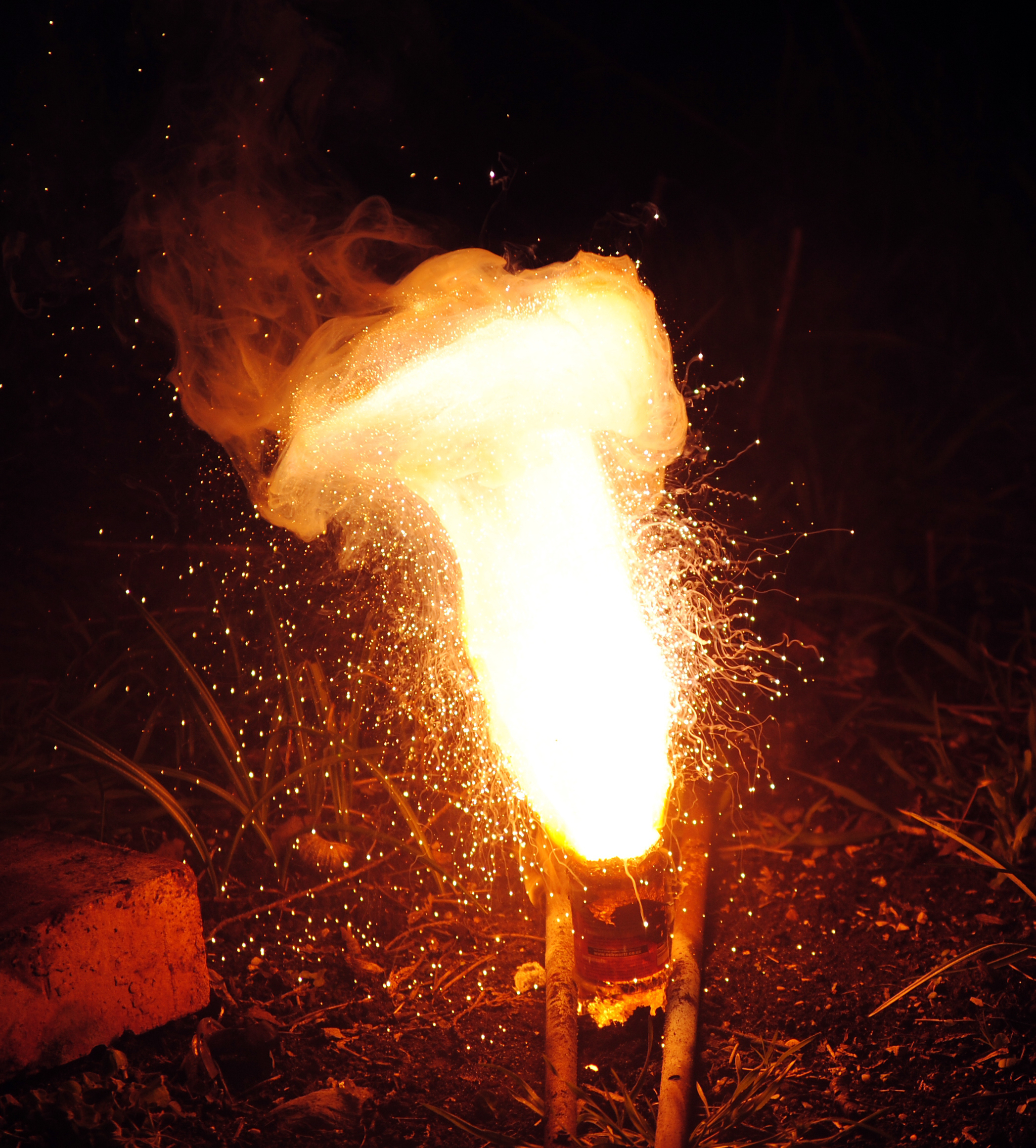
An exothermic thermite reaction using iron(III) oxide. The sparks flying outwards are globules of molten iron trailing smoke in their wake.

Some examples of exothermic processes are:

- Combustion of fuels such as wood, coal and oil/petroleum
- The thermite reaction
- The reaction of alkali metals and other highly electropositive metals with water
- Condensation of rain from water vapor
- Mixing water and strong acids or strong bases
- The reaction of acids and bases
- Dehydration of carbohydrates by sulfuric acid
- The setting of cement and concrete
- Some polymerization reactions such as the setting of epoxy resin
- The reaction of most metals with halogens or oxygen
- Nuclear fusion in hydrogen bombs and in stellar cores (to iron)
- Nuclear fission of heavy elements
- The reaction between zinc and hydrochloric acid
- Respiration (breaking down of glucose to release energy in cells)

== Implications for chemical reactions ==
Chemical exothermic reactions are generally more spontaneous than their counterparts, endothermic reactions.

In a thermochemical reaction that is exothermic, the heat may be listed among the products of the reaction.

== See also ==
- Calorimetry
- Chemical thermodynamics
- Differential scanning calorimetry
- Endergonic
- Endergonic reaction
- Exergonic
- Exergonic reaction
- Endothermic reaction
