= Exergonic reaction =

Chemical reaction that releases more energy than was needed to start it

An exergonic reaction (such as cellular respiration) is a reaction that releases free energy in the process of the reaction. The progress of the reaction is shown by the line. Activation energy (1) slows down the reaction. The change of Gibbs free energy (ΔG) in an exergonic reaction (that takes place at constant pressure and temperature) is negative because energy is lost (2).

In chemical thermodynamics, an exergonic reaction is a chemical reaction where the change in the free energy is negative (there is a net release of free energy). This indicates a spontaneous reaction if the system is closed and initial and final temperatures are the same. For processes that take place in a closed system at constant pressure and temperature, the Gibbs free energy is used, whereas the Helmholtz energy is relevant for processes that take place at constant volume and temperature. Any reaction occurring at constant temperature without input of electrical or photon energy is exergonic, according to the second law of thermodynamics. An example is cellular respiration.

Symbolically, the release of free energy, $G$, in an exergonic reaction (at constant pressure and temperature) is denoted as

$$\Delta G=G_{\rm{p}}-G_{\rm{r}}<0.\,$$

Although exergonic reactions are said to occur spontaneously, this does not imply that the reaction will take place at an observable rate. For instance, the disproportionation of hydrogen peroxide releases free energy but is very slow in the absence of a suitable catalyst. It has been suggested that eager would be a more intuitive term in this context.

More generally, the terms exergonic and endergonic relate to the free energy change in any process, not just chemical reactions. By contrast, the terms exothermic and endothermic relate to an enthalpy change in a closed system during a process, usually associated with the exchange of heat.

== See also ==
- Endergonic reaction
