= Mean kinetic temperature =

Temperature metric

In the pharmaceutical industry, Mean kinetic temperature (MKT) is a calculated temperature that represents the equivalent thermal effect of temperature variations over time, such that the degradation occurring under fluctuating conditions is equal to that which would occur at a constant MKT value.

The mean kinetic temperature can be expressed as:

$$T_K=\cfrac{\frac{\Delta H}{R}}{-\ln \left ( \frac{{t_1}e^ \left ( \frac{-\Delta H}{RT_1}\right ) + {t_2}e^ \left ( \frac{-\Delta H}{RT_2}\right ) + \cdots + {t_n}e^ \left ( \frac{-\Delta H}{RT_n}\right )}{{t_1} + {t_2} + \cdots + {t_n}} \right )}$$

Where:

$T_K\,\!$ is the mean kinetic temperature in kelvins
$\Delta H\,\!$ is the activation energy (in kJ mol^{−1})
$R\,\!$ is the gas constant (in J mol^{−1} K^{−1})
$T_1\,\!$ to $T_n\,\!$ are the temperatures at each of the sample points in kelvins
$t_1\,\!$ to $t_n\,\!$ are time intervals at each of the sample points

When the temperature readings are taken at the same interval (i.e., $t_1\,\!$ = $t_2\,\!$ = $\cdots$ = $t_n\,\!$), the above equation is reduced to:

$$T_K=\cfrac{\frac{\Delta H}{R}}{-\ln \left ( \frac{e^ \left ( \frac{-\Delta H}{RT_1}\right ) + e^ \left ( \frac{-\Delta H}{RT_2}\right ) + \cdots + e^ \left ( \frac{-\Delta H}{RT_n}\right )}{n} \right )}$$

Where:

$n\,\!$ is the number of temperature sample points
