= Endergonic reaction =

Chemical reaction which requires more energy to initiate than it produces

An endergonic reaction (such as photosynthesis) is a reaction that requires energy to be driven. Endergonic means "absorbing energy in the form of work." The activation energy for the reaction is typically larger than the overall energy of the exergonic reaction (1). Endergonic reactions are nonspontaneous. The progress of the reaction is shown by the line. The change of Gibbs free energy (ΔG) during an endergonic reaction is a positive value because energy is gained (2).

In chemical thermodynamics, an endergonic reaction (from Greek ἔνδον (endon) 'within' and ἔργον (ergon) 'work'; also called a heat absorbing nonspontaneous reaction or an unfavorable reaction) is a chemical reaction in which the standard change in free energy is positive, and an additional driving force is needed to perform this reaction. In layman's terms, the total amount of useful energy is negative (it takes more energy to start the reaction than what is received out of it) so the total energy is a net negative result, as opposed to a net positive result in an exergonic reaction. Another way to phrase this is that useful energy must be absorbed from the surroundings into the workable system for the reaction to happen.

Under constant temperature and constant pressure conditions, this means that the change in the standard Gibbs free energy would be positive,

$$\Delta G^\circ > 0$$

for the reaction at standard state (i.e. at standard pressure (1 bar), and standard concentrations (1 molar) of all the reagents).

In metabolism, an endergonic process is anabolic, meaning that energy is stored; in many such anabolic processes, energy is supplied by coupling the reaction to adenosine triphosphate (ATP) and consequently resulting in a high energy, negatively charged organic phosphate and positive adenosine diphosphate.

== Equilibrium constant ==
The equilibrium constant for the reaction is related to ΔG° by the relation:

$$K = e^{-\frac{\Delta G^\circ}{RT}}$$

where T is the absolute temperature and R is the gas constant. A positive value of ΔG° therefore implies

$$K < 1 \,$$

so that starting from molar stoichiometric quantities such a reaction would move backwards toward equilibrium, not forwards.

Nevertheless, endergonic reactions are quite common in nature, especially in biochemistry and physiology. Examples of endergonic reactions in cells include protein synthesis, and the Na^{+}/K^{+} pump which drives nerve conduction and muscle contraction.

== Gibbs free energy for endergonic reactions ==
All physical and chemical systems in the universe follow the second law of thermodynamics and proceed in a downhill, i.e., exergonic, direction. Thus, left to itself, any physical or chemical system will proceed, according to the second law of thermodynamics, in a direction that tends to lower the free energy of the system, and thus to expend energy in the form of work. These reactions occur spontaneously.

A chemical reaction is endergonic when non spontaneous. Thus in this type of reaction the Gibbs free energy increases. The entropy is included in any change of the Gibbs free energy. This differs from an endothermic reaction where the entropy is not included. The Gibbs free energy is calculated with the Gibbs–Helmholtz equation:

$$\Delta G = \Delta H- T \cdot \Delta S$$

where:

$T$ = temperature in kelvins (K)
$\Delta G$ = change in the Gibbs free energy
$\Delta S$ = change in entropy (at 298 K) as $\Delta S = \sum S(\text{Product}) - \sum S(\text{Reagent})$
$\Delta H$ = change in enthalpy (at 298 K) as $\Delta H = \sum H(\text{Product}) - \sum H(\text{Reagent})$

A chemical reaction progresses non spontaneously when the Gibbs free energy increases, in that case the $\Delta G$ is positive. In exergonic reactions the $\Delta G$ is negative and in endergonic reactions the $\Delta G$ is positive:

$\Delta_\mathrm{R} G < 0$ exergonic
$\Delta_\mathrm{R} G > 0$ endergonic

where $\Delta_\mathrm{R} G$ equals the change in the Gibbs free energy after completion of a chemical reaction.

== Making endergonic reactions happen ==
Endergonic reactions can be achieved if they are either pulled or pushed by an exergonic (stability increasing, negative change in free energy) process. Of course, in all cases the net reaction of the total system (the reaction under study plus the puller or pusher reaction) is exergonic.

=== Pull ===
Reagents can be pulled through an endergonic reaction, if the reaction products are cleared rapidly by a subsequent exergonic reaction. The concentration of the products of the endergonic reaction thus always remains low, so the reaction can proceed.

A classic example of this might be the first stage of a reaction which proceeds via a transition state. The process of getting to the top of the activation energy barrier to the transition state is endergonic. However, the reaction can proceed because having reached the transition state, it rapidly evolves via an exergonic process to the more stable final products.

=== Push ===
Endergonic reactions can be pushed by coupling them to another reaction which is strongly exergonic, through a shared intermediate.

This is often how biological reactions proceed. For example, on its own the reaction

$$\ce{X + Y -> XY}$$

may be too endergonic to occur. However it may be possible to make it occur by coupling it to a strongly exergonic reaction – such as, very often, the decomposition of ATP into ADP and inorganic phosphate ions, ATP → ADP + P_{i}, so that

$$\ce{X + {ATP} -> {XP} + {ADP}}$$
$$\ce{{XP} + Y -> {XY} + P_\mathit{i}}$$

This kind of reaction, with the ATP decomposition supplying the free energy needed to make an endergonic reaction occur, is so common in cell biochemistry that ATP is often called the "universal energy currency" of all living organisms.

== See also ==
- Exergonic
- Exergonic reaction
- Exothermic
- Endothermic
- Exothermic reaction
- Endothermic reaction
- Endotherm
- Exotherm
