= Spontaneous process =

Thermodynamic operation

In thermodynamics, a spontaneous process is a process which occurs without any external input to the system. A more technical definition is the time-evolution of a system in which it releases free energy and it moves to a lower, more thermodynamically stable energy state (closer to thermodynamic equilibrium). The sign convention for free energy change follows the general convention for thermodynamic measurements, in which a release of free energy from the system corresponds to a negative change in the free energy of the system and a positive change in the free energy of the surroundings.

Depending on the nature of the process, the free energy is determined differently. For example, the Gibbs free energy change is used when considering processes that occur under constant pressure and temperature conditions, whereas the Helmholtz free energy change is used when considering processes that occur under constant volume and temperature conditions. The value and even the sign of both free energy changes can depend upon the temperature and pressure or volume.

Because spontaneous processes are characterized by a decrease in the system's free energy, they do not need to be driven by an outside source of energy.

For cases involving an isolated system where no energy is exchanged with the surroundings, spontaneous processes are characterized by an increase in entropy.

A spontaneous reaction is a chemical reaction which is a spontaneous process under the conditions of interest.

== Overview ==
In general, the spontaneity of a process only determines whether or not a process can occur and makes no indication as to whether or not the process will occur at an observable rate. In other words, spontaneity is a necessary, but not sufficient, condition for a process to actually occur. Furthermore, spontaneity makes no implication as to the speed at which the spontaneous process may occur - just because a process is spontaneous does not mean it will happen quickly (or at all).

As an example, the conversion of a diamond into graphite is a spontaneous process at room temperature and pressure. Despite being spontaneous, this process does not occur since the high activation energy of this reaction renders it too slow to observe.

== Using free energy to determine spontaneity ==
For a process that occurs at constant temperature and pressure, spontaneity can be determined using the change in Gibbs free energy, which is given by:

$$\Delta G = \Delta H - T \Delta S \,,$$

where the sign of ΔG depends on the signs of the changes in enthalpy (ΔH) and entropy (ΔS). If these two signs are the same (both positive or both negative), then the sign of ΔG will change from positive to negative (or vice-versa) at the temperature T = ΔH/ΔS.

In cases where ΔG is:

- negative, the process is spontaneous and may proceed in the forward direction as written.
- positive, the process is non-spontaneous as written, but it may proceed spontaneously in the reverse direction.
- zero, the process is at equilibrium, with no net change taking place over time.

This set of rules can be used to determine four distinct cases by examining the signs of the ΔS and ΔH.

- When ΔS > 0 and ΔH < 0, the process is always spontaneous as written.
- When ΔS < 0 and ΔH > 0, the process is never spontaneous, but the reverse process is always spontaneous.
- When ΔS > 0 and ΔH > 0, the process will be spontaneous at high temperatures and non-spontaneous at low temperatures.
- When ΔS < 0 and ΔH < 0, the process will be spontaneous at low temperatures and non-spontaneous at high temperatures.

For the latter two cases, the temperature at which the spontaneity changes will be determined by the relative magnitudes of ΔS and ΔH.

== Using entropy to determine spontaneity ==
When using the entropy change of a process to assess spontaneity, it is important to carefully consider the definition of the system and surroundings. The second law of thermodynamics states that a process involving an isolated system will be spontaneous if the entropy of the system increases over time. For open or closed systems, however, the statement must be modified to say that the total entropy of the combined system and surroundings must increase, or,
$$\Delta S_\text{total} = \Delta S_\text{system} + \Delta S_\text{surroundings} \ge 0 \,.$$

This criterion can then be used to explain how it is possible for the entropy of an open or closed system to decrease during a spontaneous process. A decrease in system entropy can only occur spontaneously if the entropy change of the surroundings is both positive in sign and has a larger magnitude than the entropy change of the system:
$$\Delta S_\text{surroundings} > 0$$
and
$$\left|\Delta S_\text{surroundings}\right| > \left|\Delta S_\text{system}\right|$$

In many processes, the increase in entropy of the surroundings is accomplished via heat transfer from the system to the surroundings (i.e. an exothermic process).

== See also ==
- Endergonic reaction – reactions which are not spontaneous at standard temperature, pressure, and concentrations.
- Diffusion – spontaneous phenomenon that minimizes Gibbs free energy.
- Quantum tunnelling
