= Endothermic process =

Thermodynamic process absorbing energy from its surroundings

An endothermic process is a chemical or physical process that absorbs heat from its surroundings. In terms of thermodynamics, it is a thermodynamic process with an increase in the enthalpy H (or internal energy U) of the system. In an endothermic process, the heat that a system absorbs is thermal energy transfer into the system. Thus, an endothermic reaction generally leads to a decrease in the temperature of the surroundings.

The term was coined by 19th-century French chemist Marcellin Berthelot. The term endothermic comes from the Greek ἔνδον (endon) meaning 'within' and θερμ- (therm) meaning 'hot' or 'warm'.

An endothermic process may be a chemical process, such as dissolving ammonium nitrate (NH_{4}NO_{3}) in water (H_{2}O), or a physical process, such as the melting of ice cubes.

The opposite of an endothermic process is an exothermic process, one that releases or "gives out" energy, usually in the form of heat and sometimes as electrical energy. Thus, endo in endothermic refers to energy or heat going in, and exo in exothermic refers to energy or heat going out. In each term (endothermic and exothermic) the prefix refers to where heat (or electrical energy) goes as the process occurs.

== In chemistry ==
The formation of barium thiocyanate from ammonium thiocyanate and barium hydroxide is so endothermic that it can freeze a beaker to wet styrofoam

Due to bonds breaking and forming during various processes (changes in state, chemical reactions), there is usually a change in energy. If the energy of the forming bonds is greater than the energy of the breaking bonds, then energy is released. This is known as an exothermic reaction. However, if more energy is needed to break the bonds than the energy being released, energy is taken up. Therefore, it is an endothermic reaction.

== Details ==
Whether a process can occur spontaneously depends not only on the enthalpy change but also on the entropy change (∆S) and absolute temperature T. If a process is a spontaneous process at a certain temperature, the products have a lower Gibbs free energy G = H – TS than the reactants (an exergonic process), even if the enthalpy of the products is higher. Thus, an endothermic process usually requires a favorable entropy increase (∆S > 0) in the system that overcomes the unfavorable increase in enthalpy so that still ∆G < 0. While endothermic phase transitions into more disordered states of higher entropy, e.g. melting and vaporization, are common, spontaneous chemical processes at moderate temperatures are rarely endothermic. The enthalpy increase ∆H ≫ 0 in a hypothetical strongly endothermic process usually results in ∆G = ∆H – T∆S > 0, which means that the process will not occur (unless driven by electrical or photon energy). An example of an endothermic and exergonic process is

$$\ce{C6H12O6 + 6 H2O -> 12 H2 + 6 CO2}$$
$$\Delta_r H^\circ = +627 \ \text{kJ/mol},\quad  \Delta_r G^\circ = -31 \ \text{kJ/mol}$$.

== Examples ==
- Evaporation
- Sublimation
- Cracking of alkanes
- Thermal decomposition
- Hydrolysis
- Nucleosynthesis of elements heavier than nickel in stellar cores
- High-energy neutrons can produce tritium from lithium-7 in an endothermic process, consuming 2.466 MeV. This was discovered when the 1954 Castle Bravo nuclear test produced an unexpectedly high yield.
- Nuclear fusion of elements heavier than iron in supernovae
- Dissolving together barium hydroxide and ammonium chloride

== Distinction between endothermic and endotherm ==
The terms "endothermic" and "endotherm" are both derived from Greek ἔνδον endon "within" and θέρμη thermē "heat", but depending on context, they can have very different meanings.

In physics, thermodynamics applies to processes involving a system and its surroundings, and the term "endothermic" is used to describe a reaction where energy is taken "(with)in" by the system (vs. an "exothermic" reaction, which releases energy "outwards").

In biology, thermoregulation is the ability of an organism to maintain its body temperature, and the term "endotherm" refers to an organism that can do so from "within" by using the heat released by its internal bodily functions (vs. an "ectotherm", which relies on external, environmental heat sources) to maintain an adequate temperature.
