= Marco Fontani =

Italian chemist (born 1969)

- Born: 5 May 1969 (age 57); Florence, Italy
- Education: University of Florence
- Known for: "The Lost Elements: The Periodic Table's Shadow Side" book
- Scientific career
- Fields: History of Chemistry, electrochemistry, organometallic chemistry
- Workplaces: University of Florence

Marco Fontani (born 5 May 1969 in Florence) is a chemist and chemistry historian, author of over 120 publications in materials chemistry, organometallic chemistry, electrochemistry and the history of chemistry. He is also a member of the board of directors of the Italian National Society of History of Chemistry (Gruppo Nazionale di Storia e Fondamenti della Chimica).

He wrote the books: The Lost Elements: The Periodic Table's Shadow Side and Chemistry and Chemists in Florence: From the Last of the Medici Family to the European Magnetic Resonance Center. Both edited in Italian and English.

He has been working at the Department of Organic Chemistry at the University of Florence since 2003.
