= 1606 in science =

| List of years in science | (table) |
- … 1596; 1597; 1598; 1599; 1600; 1601; 1602; 1603; 1604; 1605; 1606; 1607; 1608; 1609; 1610; 1611; 1612; 1613; 1614; 1615; 1616 …
- Art; Archaeology; Architecture; Literature; Music; Philosophy; Science; +...

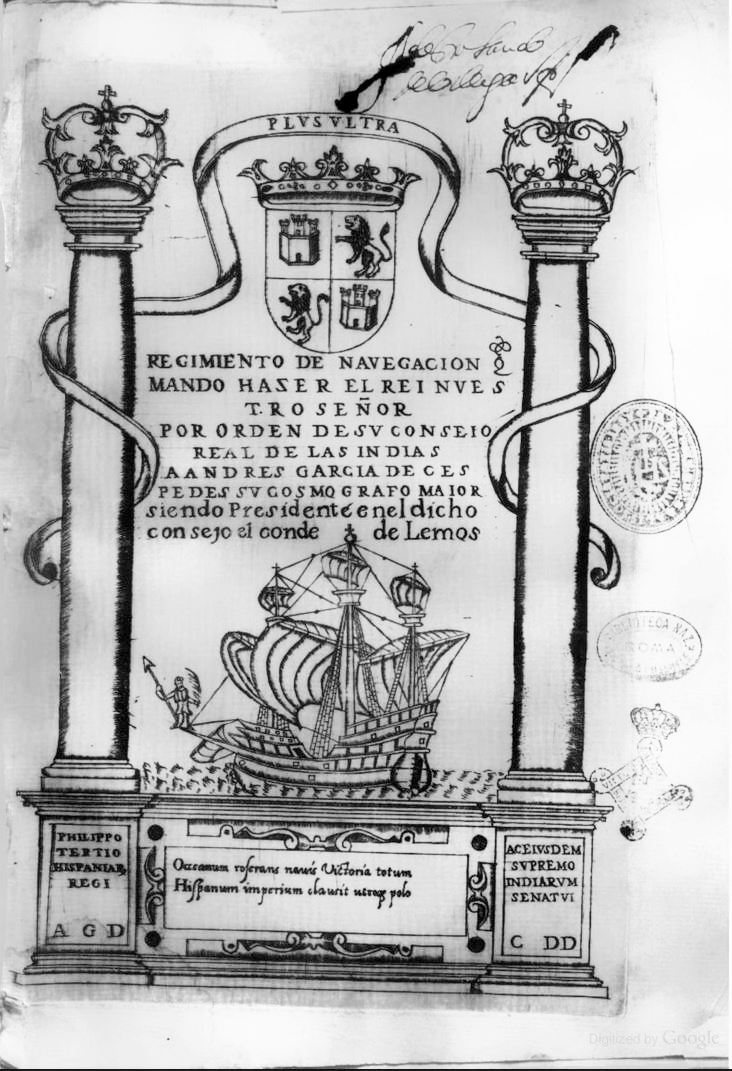
Frontispiece of the book Regimiento de Navegación by Andrés García os Céspedes, published in 1606.

The year 1606 in science and technology involved some significant events.

== Cryptography ==
- The cryptographic text Steganographia, written by Johannes Trithemius c.1499/1500, is published in Frankfurt.

== Exploration ==
- February 26
  - Dutch navigator Willem Janszoon makes the first confirmed sighting of Australia by a European.
  - Pedro Fernandes de Queirós discovers the Pitcairn Islands.
- March – The Dutch ship Duyfken, under Captain Willem Janszoon, explores the western coast of Cape York Peninsula.
- May – Pedro Fernandes de Queirós discovers the islands of Vanuatu; believing them to be Australia, he names them La Austrialia del Espiritu Santo.
- October – Luís Vaz de Torres is the first European to sail through the Torres Strait.

== Mathematics ==
- Giovanni Antonio Magini devises trigonometric tables of high accuracy.

== Physics ==
- Approx. date – Galileo invents a thermometer based on the expansion of gas.

== Technology ==
- The first recorded instance of a bayonet published in the Chinese military treatise Binglu.

== Births ==
- January 4 (bapt.) – Edmund Castell, English orientalist (died 1685)

== Deaths ==
- September 28 – Nicolaus Taurellus, German philosopher and scientist (born 1547)
- November 13 – Girolamo Mercuriale, Italian physician and historian (born 1530)
- Lucas Janszoon Waghenaer, Dutch nautical chart maker (born 1533/4)
