= 1604 in science =

List of years in science	(table)
- … 1594; 1595; 1596; 1597; 1598; 1599; 1600; 1601; 1602; 1603; 1604; 1605; 1606; 1607; 1608; 1609; 1610; 1611; 1612; 1613; 1614 …
- Art; Archaeology; Architecture; Literature; Music; Philosophy; Science; +...

The year 1604 in science and technology involved some significant events.

== Astronomy ==
- 9 October – The supernova which becomes known as Kepler's Supernova (SN 1604) is first observed from northern Italy. From 17 October, Johannes Kepler begins a year's observation of it from Prague. As of 2006, this is the last supernova to be observed in the Milky Way, and the last visible by the naked eye until 1987.

== Exploration ==
- France begins settlement in French Guiana.
- Russian city of Tomsk founded in Siberia.

== Medicine ==
- Johannes Kepler describes how the eye focuses light.
- Hieronymus Fabricius's De formato foetu (On fetus development), an embryology textbook.
- Joseph du Chesne's Ad veritatem hermeticae medicinae ex Hippocratis veterumque decretis ac therapeusi.

== Physics ==
- Johannes Kepler specifies the law of rectilinear propagation for light waves.
- Luca Valerio publishes his treatise on determining the center of gravity of solids, De centro gravitatis solidorum libri tres, in Rome.

== Technology ==
- 1 October – The Wollaton Wagonway, from Strelley, Nottingham, to Wollaton in England, is known to have been completed by this date, being the world's first recorded overland wagonway. It runs for approximately two miles (5 km) and is built by Huntingdon Beaumont for coal haulage.

== Births ==
- 10 March – Johann Rudolf Glauber, German-born chemical engineer (died 1670)

== Deaths ==
- 5 June – Thomas Muffet, English naturalist and physician (born 1553)
- before August – William Clowes, English surgeon (born c. 1543)
- approximate date – Juan Fernández, Spanish explorer (born c. 1536)
