= 1607 in science =

List of years in science	(table)
- … 1597; 1598; 1599; 1600; 1601; 1602; 1603; 1604; 1605; 1606; 1607; 1608; 1609; 1610; 1611; 1612; 1613; 1614; 1615; 1616; 1617 …
- Art; Archaeology; Architecture; Literature; Music; Philosophy; Science; +...

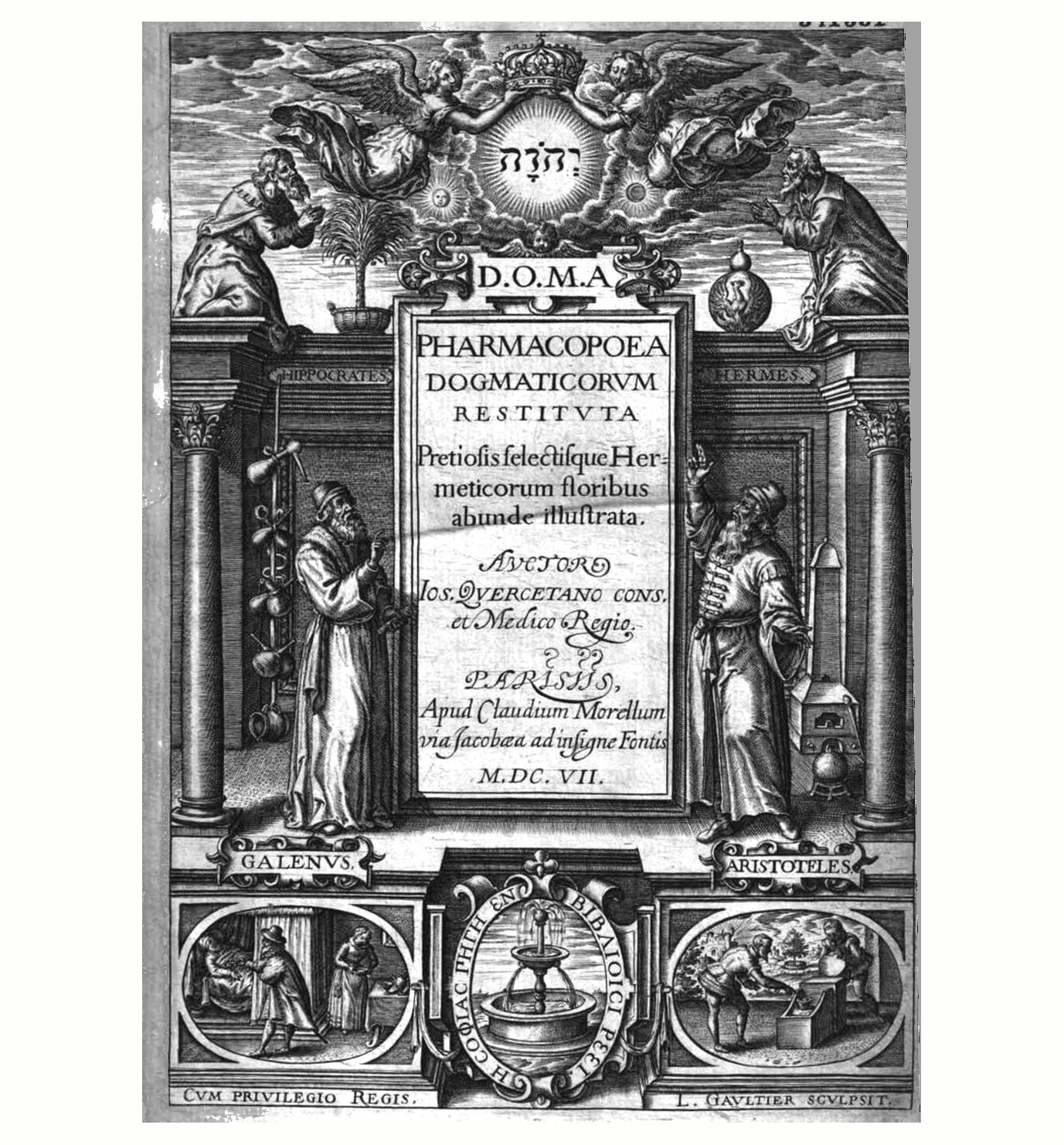

The year 1607 in science and technology involved some significant events.

== Astronomy ==
- Johannes Kepler records the appearance and motion of a comet, later to be known as Comet Halley.

== Medicine ==
- Giovanni Antonio Magini defends the use of astrology in medicine in his De astrologica ratione (published in Venice).

== Technology ==
- Howitzers are invented, by a Frenchman.

== Zoology ==
- Edward Topsell's bestiary The Historie of Foure-Footed Beasts is published in London by William Jaggard.

== Births ==
- between 31 October and 6 December – Pierre de Fermat, French mathematician (d. 1665)

== Deaths ==
- 6 January – Guidobaldo del Monte, Italian mathematician (born 1545)
- 28 June – Domenico Fontana, Italian architect (born 1543)
- 22 August – Bartholomew Gosnold, English explorer and privateer (born 1572)
- Georg Bartisch, German physician and ophthalmologist (born 1535)
