= 1608 in science =

List of years in science	(table)
- … 1598; 1599; 1600; 1601; 1602; 1603; 1604; 1605; 1606; 1607; 1608; 1609; 1610; 1611; 1612; 1613; 1614; 1615; 1616; 1617; 1618 …
- Art; Archaeology; Architecture; Literature; Music; Philosophy; Science; +...

The year 1608 in science and technology involved some significant events.

== Technology ==
- October 2 – Hans Lippershey demonstrates the first known telescope to the government of the Dutch Republic.
- The flintlock muzzleloader is invented; unlike most weapon systems which only lasted a few decades, the flintlock has a long-term impact.
- The manufacture of alum is invented and successfully practised in England, under the patronage of King James, by Lord Sheffield.

== Zoology ==
- Edward Topsell's bestiary The Historie of Serpents is published in London by William Jaggard.

== Births ==
- January 28 – Giovanni Alfonso Borelli, Italian scientist (died 1679)
- August 4 – John Tradescant the younger, English botanist (died 1662)
- October 15 – Evangelista Torricelli, Italian physicist and mathematician (died 1647)

== Deaths ==
- December – Oswald Croll, German chemist and physician (born c1560)
