= 1610 in science =

List of years in science	(table)
- … 1600; 1601; 1602; 1603; 1604; 1605; 1606; 1607; 1608; 1609; 1610; 1611; 1612; 1613; 1614; 1615; 1616; 1617; 1618; 1619; 1620 …
- Art; Archaeology; Architecture; Literature; Music; Philosophy; Science; +...

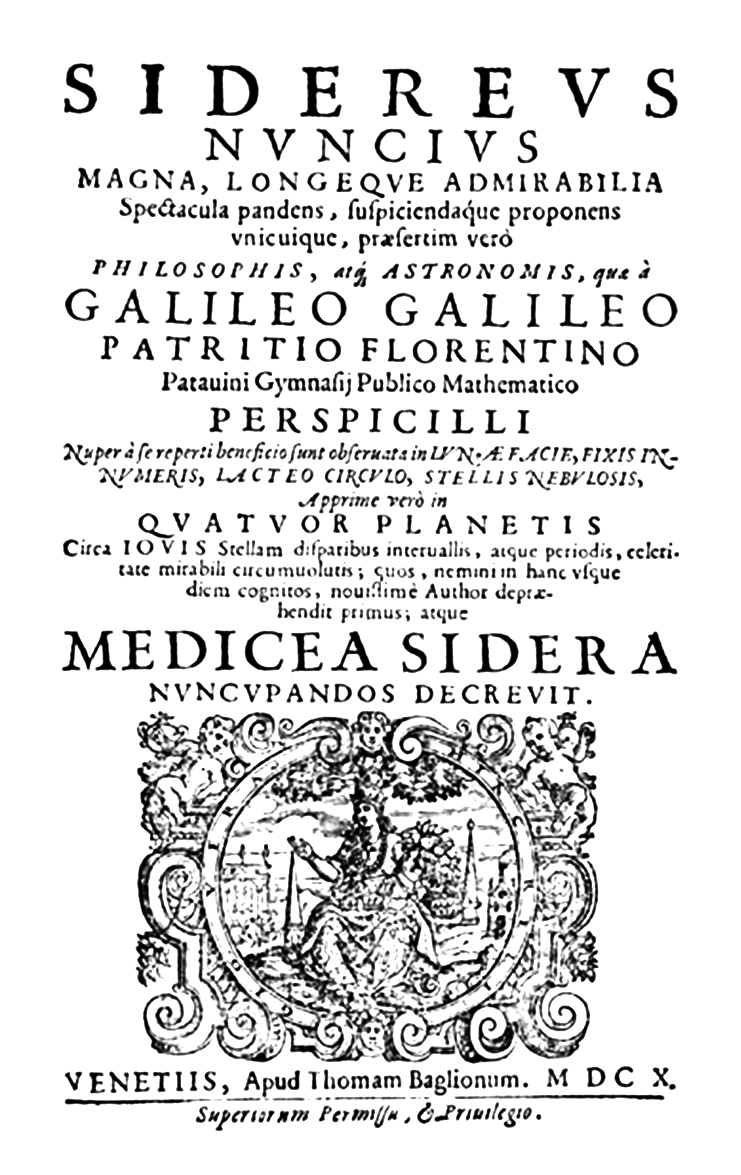
Title page of Sidereus Nuncius (1610), by Galileo Galilei

The year 1610 in science and technology involved some significant events.

== Astronomy ==
- January 7 – Galileo Galilei first observes the four large Galilean moons of Jupiter: Ganymede, Callisto, Europa and Io, although he is unable to distinguish the latter two until the following night. In the same year he publishes his first observations by telescope in a short treatise entitled Sidereus Nuncius ("Sidereal Messenger").
- December – English scientist Thomas Harriot becomes one of the first to view sunspots through a telescope
- The Orion Nebula is discovered by Nicolas-Claude Fabri de Peiresc.

== Medicine ==
- Diphtheria epidemic in Naples, during which Marco Aurelio Severino performs successful tracheotomies.

== Technology ==
- Jean Beguin publishes Tyrocinium Chymicum, the first book of chemistry lectures.
- Tinsel is invented by a German silversmith, who uses real silver for the metal strands.
- Bagels are created in Kraków, Poland and given as gifts to women after childbirth.

== Births ==
- February 2 – Pierre Bourdelot, French physician, anatomist, freethinker, abbé and libertine (died 1685)
- Maria Cunitz, Silesian astronomer (died 1664)
- Marie Meurdrac, French chemist and alchemist (died 1680)

== Deaths ==
- Abul Qasim ibn Mohammed al-Ghassani, Moroccan physician (born 1548)
- Nikola Vitov Gučetić, Ragusan polymath (born 1549)
- Peter Lowe, Scottish surgeon (born c. 1550)
- Paarangot Jyeshtadevan Namboodiri, Keralan mathematician and astronomer (born c. 1500)
- December 31 – Ludolph van Ceulen, German mathematician (born 1540)
