= 1618 in science =

List of years in science	(table)
- … 1608; 1609; 1610; 1611; 1612; 1613; 1614; 1615; 1616; 1617; 1618; 1619; 1620; 1621; 1622; 1623; 1624; 1625; 1626; 1627; 1628 …
- Art; Archaeology; Architecture; Literature; Music; Philosophy; Science; +...

The year 1618 in science and technology involved some significant events.

== Astronomy ==
- March 8 – May 15 – Johannes Kepler formulates the third law of planetary motion.
- July 21 – Pluto (not known at this time) reaches an aphelion. It next comes to aphelion in 1866.
- Johann Baptist Cysat, Swiss Jesuit geometer and astronomer and one of Christoph Scheiner's pupils, becomes the first to study a comet through the telescope and gives the first description of the nucleus and coma of a comet.
- September 6–25 – The Great Comet of 1618 is visible to the naked eye. James I described it as "Venus with a firebrand in her arse".

== Biology ==
- Fortunio Liceti's De spontaneo Viventium Ortu supports the theory of spontaneous generation of organisms.

== Medicine ==
- The College of Physicians of London publishes the Pharmacopœia Londinensis.

== Births ==
- April 2 – Francesco Maria Grimaldi, Italian physicist, discoverer of the diffraction of light (died 1663)
- Jeremiah Horrocks, English astronomer (died 1641)

== Deaths ==
- June 6 – Sir James Lancaster, English navigator (born 1554)
- October 29 – Walter Ralegh, English explorer (born c. 1554)
- Luca Valerio, Italian mathematician (born 1553)
