= 1611 in science =

List of years in science	(table)
- … 1601; 1602; 1603; 1604; 1605; 1606; 1607; 1608; 1609; 1610; 1611; 1612; 1613; 1614; 1615; 1616; 1617; 1618; 1619; 1620; 1621 …
- Art; Archaeology; Architecture; Literature; Music; Philosophy; Science; +...

The year 1611 in science and technology involved some significant events.

== Astronomy ==
- February 27 – Sunspots are observed by telescope by Frisian astronomers Johannes Fabricius and David Fabricius and Johannes publishes the results of these observations in De Maculis in Sole observatis in Wittenberg later this year. Such early discoveries are overlooked however, and the first sighting is claimed a few months later by Galileo Galilei and Christoph Scheiner.

== Mathematics ==
- Johannes Kepler produces Kepler's conjecture on sphere packing.

== Technology ==
- Completion of Cordouan lighthouse on the Gironde estuary (designed by Louis de Foix), the first wave-swept light.

== Births ==
- January 28 – Johannes Hevelius, German astronomer (died 1687)
- March 1 – John Pell, English mathematician (died 1685)
- Willem Piso, Dutch physician and naturalist (died 1678)
- Georg Marcgrave, German naturalist, explorer of Brazil (died 1644)

== Deaths ==
- August 9 – John Blagrave, English mathematician (born c.1561)
- Henry Hudson, English explorer (born c.1565)
