= 1602 in science =

List of years in science	(table)
- … 1592; 1593; 1594; 1595; 1596; 1597; 1598; 1599; 1600; 1601; 1602; 1603; 1604; 1605; 1606; 1607; 1608; 1609; 1610; 1611; 1612 …
- Art; Archaeology; Architecture; Literature; Music; Philosophy; Science; +...

The year 1602 in science and technology involved some significant events.

== Astronomy ==
- Thomas Blundeville publishes The Theoriques of the Seuen Planets, assisted by Lancelot Browne.

== Chemistry ==
- Vincenzio Cascarido discovers barium sulfide.
- Commencement of publication of Theatrum Chemicum, a compendium of European alchemical writings.

== Exploration ==
- May 15 – Bartolomew Gosnold becomes the first European to discover Cape Cod.
- Henry Briggs publishes his first mathematical work A Table to find the Height of the Pole, the Magnetical Declination being given in London.

== Medicine ==
- Felix Plater publishes Praxis medica classifying diseases by their symptoms.

== Physics ==
- Galileo begins his study of falling bodies.

== Births ==
- March 18 – Jacques de Billy, French Jesuit mathematician (died 1679)
- August 8 – Gilles de Roberval, French mathematician (died 1675)
- November 20 – Otto von Guericke, German physicist (died 1686)

== Deaths ==
- July 28 – Peder Sørensen, Danish physician (born 1542)
- Juan de Fuca, Greek navigator (born 1536)
