= 1619 in science =

List of years in science	(table)
- … 1609; 1610; 1611; 1612; 1613; 1614; 1615; 1616; 1617; 1618; 1619; 1620; 1621; 1622; 1623; 1624; 1625; 1626; 1627; 1628; 1629 …
- Art; Archaeology; Architecture; Literature; Music; Philosophy; Science; +...

The year 1619 in science and technology involved some significant events.

== Astronomy ==
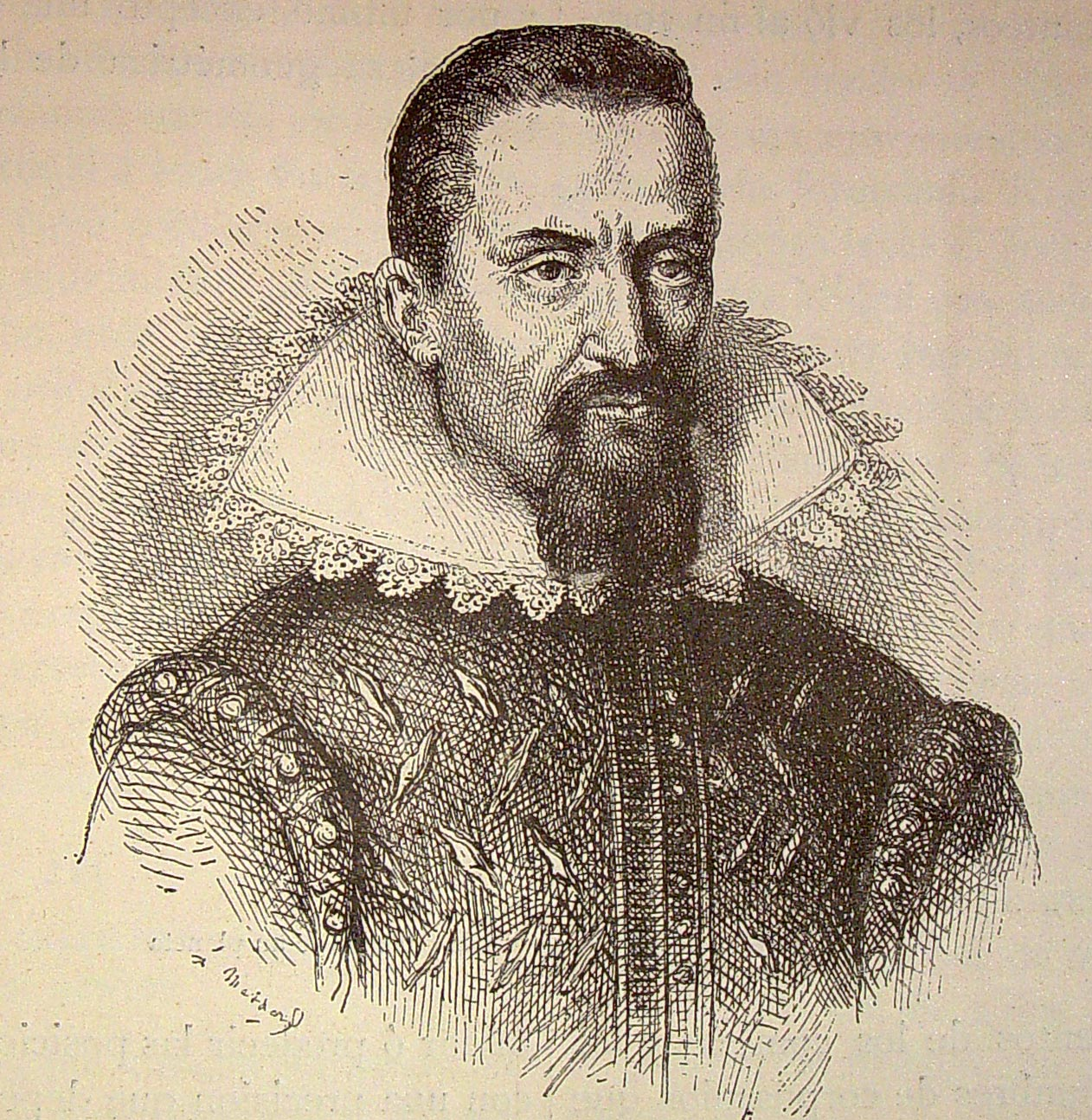
Publication of Johannes Kepler's third law of planetary motion in his Harmonices Mundi. He also recognises the duality of convex polyhedra

- Publication of Johannes Kepler's third law of planetary motion in his Harmonices Mundi. He also recognises the duality of convex polyhedra.
- Publication of the Jesuit Giuseppe Biancani's Sphaera mundi, seu cosmographia demonstrativa, ac facili methodo tradita in Bologna.

== Biochemistry ==
- Lactose is discovered by Fabriccio Bartoletti; the word lactose comes from the Latin word lac which means "milk".

== Exploration ==
- In North America, the Churchill River is discovered by Danish explorer Jens Munk, and it will be used for over 100 years as a trading route of the Hudson's Bay Company from their fort at its mouth to the interior.
- Frederick de Houtman and Jans van Edel discover the Houtman Abrolhos islands.

== Medicine ==
- Dermod O'Meara's text on genetic disorders, De Moribus: Pathologia Haereditaria Generalis is published in Dublin, the first medical text published in Ireland.

== Metallurgy ==
- Sir Basil Brooke produces steel using a reverbatory furnace in Coalbrookdale, England.

== Births ==
- probable date – Daniel Whistler, English physician (died 1684)

== Deaths ==
- May 21 – Hieronymus Fabricius, Italian anatomist and embryologist (born 1537)
- September – Hans Lippershey, Dutch lensmaker, credited with inventing the telescope in 1608 (born c. 1570)
- Olivier de Serres, French soil scientist (born 1539)
- Caterina Vitale, Maltese chemist (born 1566)
