= 1612 in science =

List of years in science	(table)
- … 1602; 1603; 1604; 1605; 1606; 1607; 1608; 1609; 1610; 1611; 1612; 1613; 1614; 1615; 1616; 1617; 1618; 1619; 1620; 1621; 1622 …
- Art; Archaeology; Architecture; Literature; Music; Philosophy; Science; +...

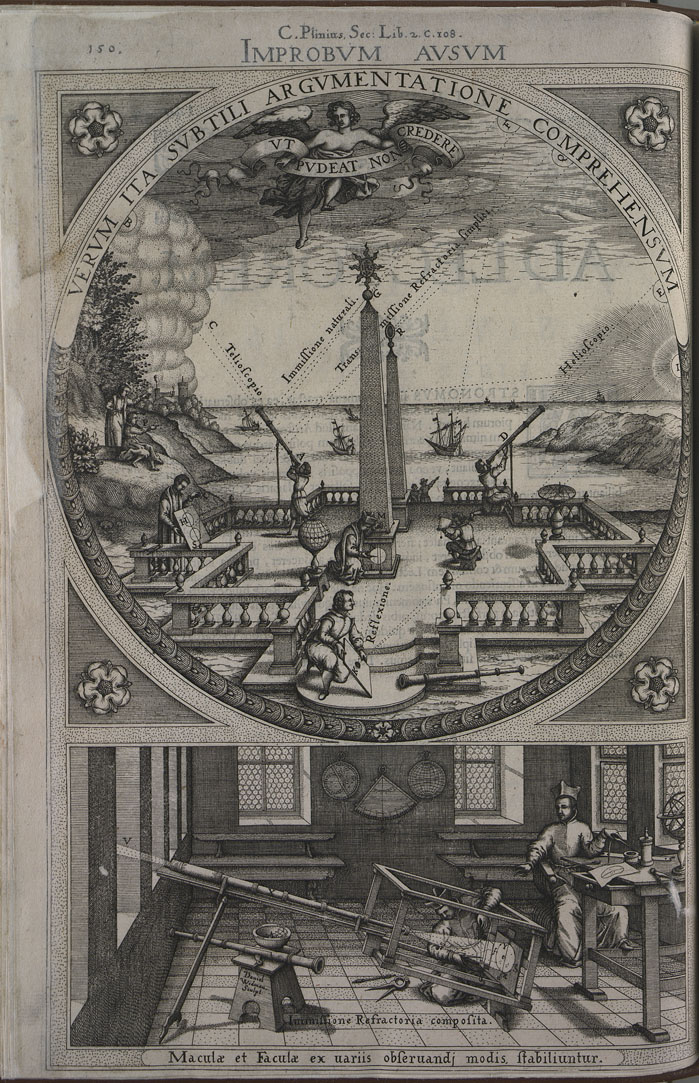
A 1612 method of observation of the sun

The year 1612 in science and technology involved some significant events.

== Astronomy ==
- The first description of the Andromeda Galaxy based on observations by telescope is given by Simon Marius.
- December 28 – Galileo observes the planet Neptune for the first time when it is in conjunction with Jupiter, but mistakenly catalogues it as a fixed star because of its extremely slow motion along the ecliptic, and it will not be properly identified until 1846.

== Medicine ==
- Santorio Sanctorius puts the thermometer to medical use.

== Births ==
- approx. date – William Gascoigne, English inventor (died 1644)

== Deaths ==
- February – John Gerard, English herbalist (born c. 1545)
- February 6 – Christopher Clavius, German mathematician and astronomer (born 1537)
- February 12 – Jodocus Hondius, Flemish cartographer (born 1563)
- November 20 – Sir John Harington, English inventor (born 1561)
