= 1601 in science =

List of years in science	(table)
- … 1591; 1592; 1593; 1594; 1595; 1596; 1597; 1598; 1599; 1600; 1601; 1602; 1603; 1604; 1605; 1606; 1607; 1608; 1609; 1610; 1611 …
- Art; Archaeology; Architecture; Literature; Music; Philosophy; Science; +...

The year 1601 CE in science and technology included many events, some of which are listed below.

== Computer science ==
- January 1 – Retrospectively the epoch reference date from which ANSI dates are counted in COBOL and other computer languages, and the base of Windows FILETIME timestamps which are stored as a 63 bit counter, whose last valid timestamp is on 14 September, AD 30828 at 02:48:05.4775807 UTC.

== Exploration ==
- August 26 – Olivier van Noort completes his circumnavigation of the world.

== Mathematics ==
- Johannes Kepler is appointed imperial mathematician to the Habsburg Empire.

== Physiology and medicine ==
- Giulio Cesare Casseri publishes a treatise on the anatomy of the vocal and auditory organs Latin: De vocis auditusque organis historia anatomica in Ferrara.

== Births ==
- possible date – Edward Somerset, 2nd Marquess of Worcester, English inventor (d. 1667)

== Deaths ==
- October 24 – Tycho Brahe, Danish astronomer (b. 1546)
