= 1599 in science =

List of years in science	(table)
- … 1589; 1590; 1591; 1592; 1593; 1594; 1595; 1596; 1597; 1598; 1599; 1600; 1601; 1602; 1603; 1604; 1605; 1606; 1607; 1608; 1609 …
- Art; Archaeology; Architecture; Literature; Music; Philosophy; Science; +...

The year 1599 in science and technology involved some significant events.

== Astronomy ==
- January 31 – During an observation of the lunar eclipse, Tycho Brahe discovers that his predictive theory about the movement of the Moon is wrong since the eclipse started 24 minutes before his calculations predicted: he improves on his theory.
- March 21 – Tycho sends a letter to Longomontanus, in which he reports his revised theory.
- June 14 – Tycho leaves Wittenberg and moves to Bohemia where he has been offered residence at the castle of Benátky, recently bought by Rudolf II, the Holy Roman Emperor.
- July 22 – Tycho observes a solar eclipse from Prague.

== Biology ==
- Ulisse Aldrovandi begins publication of his Ornithologiae.
- Lawyer Carlo Ruini's Anatomia del cavallo is published posthumously in Venice. This anatomy of the horse is the first published of any non-human animal.

== Chemistry ==
- Publication of the supposed German alchemist Basil Valentine's Ein kurtz summarischer Tractat, von dem grossen Stein der Uralten ("Of the great stone of the ancients").

== Geography ==
- George Abbot publishes the student geography textbook A Brief Description of the Whole World.
- Approximate date – A world map to accompany a new edition of Richard Hakluyt's The Principal Navigations, Voiages, and Discoveries of the English Nation and attributed to Edward Wright is the first using the Mercator projection to be engraved in England.

== Navigation ==
- Edward Wright publishes Certaine Errors in Navigation, explaining the mathematical basis of the Mercator projection, and giving a reference table of adjustments required for its use in navigation.

== Publications ==
- Ferrante Imperato publishes Dell'Historia Naturale illustrated from the mineral and other collections in his cabinet of curiosities in Naples.

== Births ==
- November 15 – Werner Rolfinck, German scientist (died 1673)
- prob. date – Francis Glisson, English physician (died 1677)

== Deaths ==
- August – Cornelis de Houtman, Dutch explorer (born 1565)
- November 7 – Gasparo Tagliacozzi, Bolognese surgeon (born 1545)
