= 1593 in science =

List of years in science	(table)
- … 1583; 1584; 1585; 1586; 1587; 1588; 1589; 1590; 1591; 1592; 1593; 1594; 1595; 1596; 1597; 1598; 1599; 1600; 1601; 1602; 1603 …
- Art; Archaeology; Architecture; Literature; Music; Philosophy; Science; +...

The year 1593 in science and technology involved some significant events.

== Botany ==
- Founding of the Jardin des plantes de Montpellier by Pierre Richer de Belleval.
- Founding of the Botanischer Garten der Universität Heidelberg.
- Carolus Clusius becomes Professor of Botany at Leiden University, taking charge of the Hortus Botanicus Leiden.

== Geography ==
- John Norden begins publication of his Speculum Britanniae.

== Mathematics ==
- François Viète publishes Viète's formula, the first in European mathematics to represent an infinite process.

== Medicine ==
- First printed Arabic language edition of Abū ʿAlī al-Ḥusayn ibn ʿAbd Allāh ibn Sīnā's The Canon of Medicine.

== Deaths ==
- June 25 – Michele Mercati, Italian physician and botanist (born 1541)
- Li Shizhen, Chinese pharmacologist (born 1518).
