= 1596 in science =

List of years in science	(table)
- … 1586; 1587; 1588; 1589; 1590; 1591; 1592; 1593; 1594; 1595; 1596; 1597; 1598; 1599; 1600; 1601; 1602; 1603; 1604; 1605; 1606 …
- Art; Archaeology; Architecture; Literature; Music; Philosophy; Science; +...

The year 1596 in science and technology included some significant events.

== Astronomy ==
- David Fabricius discovers the first non-supernova variable star, Omicron Ceti.
- Johannes Kepler's Mysterium Cosmographicum is the first published defense of the Copernican (heliocentric) system of planetary motion.

== Botany ==
- Gaspard Bauhin publishes Pinax theatri botanici, an early classified flora.

== Mathematics ==
- Ludolph van Ceulen computes π to twenty decimal places using inscribed and circumscribed polygons.

== Medicine ==
- William Slingsby discovers that water from the Tewitt Well mineral spring at Harrogate in North Yorkshire, England, possesses similar properties to that from Spa, Belgium.
- Li Shizhen's Compendium of Materia Medica (Bencao Gangmu) is published posthumously in an illustrated edition.

== Earth sciences ==
- Abraham Ortelius, in the last edition of his Thesaurus geographicus, considers the possibility of continental drift.

== Exploration ==
- June 17 – Willem Barents makes the first documented discovery of Spitsbergen

Svalbard archipelago.

== Technology ==
- John Harington describes the "Ajax", a precursor to the modern flush toilet, in The Metamorphosis of Ajax.

== Births ==
- March 31 – René Descartes (d. 1650), French-born philosopher and mathematician.
- approximate date – Peter Mundy (d. c.1667), English traveller.

== Deaths ==
- January 27 – Sir Francis Drake (b. 1540), English explorer (at sea).
- September 15 – Leonhard Rauwolf (b. either 1535 or 1540), German botanist and physician.
- September – Pieter Dirkszoon Keyser (b. 1540?), Frisian navigator (at sea).
