= 1594 in science =

List of years in science	(table)
- … 1584; 1585; 1586; 1587; 1588; 1589; 1590; 1591; 1592; 1593; 1594; 1595; 1596; 1597; 1598; 1599; 1600; 1601; 1602; 1603; 1604 …
- Art; Archaeology; Architecture; Literature; Music; Philosophy; Science; +...

The year 1594 in science and technology involved some significant events.

== Botany ==
- Tulip bulbs planted by Carolus Clusius in the Hortus Botanicus Leiden, Holland, first flower.

== Exploration ==
- First voyage of Willem Barents in the Arctic Ocean in search of the North-east passage.
- John Davis publishes a treatise on navigation, The Seamans Secrets, and invents a version of the backstaff.
- Robert Hues publishes a practical treatise on the use of terrestrial and celestial globes in navigation, Tractatus de globis et eorum usu.

== Medicine ==
- Anatomical theatre completed at the University of Padua.

== Technology ==
- Bevis Bulmer sets up a system at Blackfriars, London, for pumping a public water supply.

== Publications ==
- Johannes Huser of Waldkirch completes the publication of Paracelsus's works.
- Baldo Angelo Abati : Opus discussarum concertationum praeclarum, de rebus, verbis, et sententiis controversis, ex omnibus fere scriptoribus, libri XV published at Pesaro.

== Deaths ==
- June 7 – Rodrigo Lopez (b. c. 1517), physician to Elizabeth I of England.
- Cristóbal Acosta (b. c. 1525), physician.
