= 1597 in science =

List of years in science	(table)
- … 1587; 1588; 1589; 1590; 1591; 1592; 1593; 1594; 1595; 1596; 1597; 1598; 1599; 1600; 1601; 1602; 1603; 1604; 1605; 1606; 1607 …
- Art; Archaeology; Architecture; Literature; Music; Philosophy; Science; +...

The year 1597 in science and technology involved some significant events.

== Astronomy ==
- Pieter Dirkszoon Keyser and Frederick de Houtman define 12 southern constellations (1595–1597), introduced later by Johann Bayer in the 1603 text Uranometria: Apus, Chamaeleon, Dorado, Grus, Hydrus, Indus, Musca, Pavo, Phoenix, Triangulum Australe, Tucana, Volans.

== Botany ==
- John Gerard's The Herball, or generall historie of plantes published in London.

== Chemistry ==
- Andreas Libavius's chemistry textbook Alchemia published.

== Births ==
- April 13 – Giovanni Battista Hodierna, Italian astronomer (died 1660)
- Henry Gellibrand, English mathematician (died 1637)

== Deaths ==
- February 6 – Franciscus Patricius (born Franjo Petriš), Venetian philosopher and scientist of Croatian descent (born 1529)
- June 20 – Willem Barentsz, Dutch explorer (born c. 1550) (at sea)
