= 1610s in archaeology =

List of years in archaeology	(table)
- … 1600; 1601; 1602; 1603; 1604; 1605; 1606; 1607; 1608; 1609; 1610; 1611; 1612; 1613; 1614; 1615; 1616; 1617; 1618; 1619; 1620 …
- In science 1607 1608 1609 1610 1611 1612 1613
- Art; Archaeology; Architecture; Literature; Music; Philosophy; Science; +...

The decade of the 1610s in archaeology involved some significant events, some of which are described here.

== Finds ==
- 1613: Remains of the Temple of Proserpina were unearthed in Mtarfa, Malta. Most of the marble blocks were later sculpted into decorative elements for new buildings.
- 1614: Tomb of the Scipios discovered in Rome. The titulus of L. Cornelius is published in 1617 by Giacomo Sirmondo in Antiquae inscriptionis, qua L. Scipionis Barbati, filii expressum est elogium, explanatio.

== Deaths ==
Preceded by 1600s in archaeology	Archaeology timeline 1610s	Succeeded by 1620s in archaeology
