= 1600s in archaeology =

List of years in archaeology	(table)
- … 1590; 1591; 1592; 1593; 1594; 1595; 1596; 1597; 1598; 1599; 1600; 1601; 1602; 1603; 1604; 1605; 1606; 1607; 1608; 1609; 1610 …
- In science 1597 1598 1599 1600 1601 1602 1603
- Art; Archaeology; Architecture; Literature; Music; Philosophy; Science; +...

The decade of the 1600s in archaeology involved some significant events.

== Events ==
- c.1600: The Savile Map of Bath, England is drawn (discovered in 1977 by Anne Campbell Mcinnes).
- 1603: In Holland, Frederik de Houtman publishes a grammar and dictionary of Malay and Malagasy, along with a treatise describing the constellations of the southern hemisphere.
- 1609: A Dutch VOC ship built in 1601 or 1602, and loaded with 18000 zinc ingots, is wrecked in 1609 off Gabon, West Africa (discovered in 1985, excavated by Michel L'Hour).

== Births ==
- c.1600: Famiano Nardini, Italian archaeologist (d. 1661)
- 1602: John Greaves, English mathematician, astronomer and antiquary (d. 1652)
- 1602: May 2 - Athanasius Kircher, German scholar (d. 1680)

Preceded by 1590s in archaeology	Archaeology timeline 1600s	Succeeded by 1610s in archaeology
