= 1535 in science =

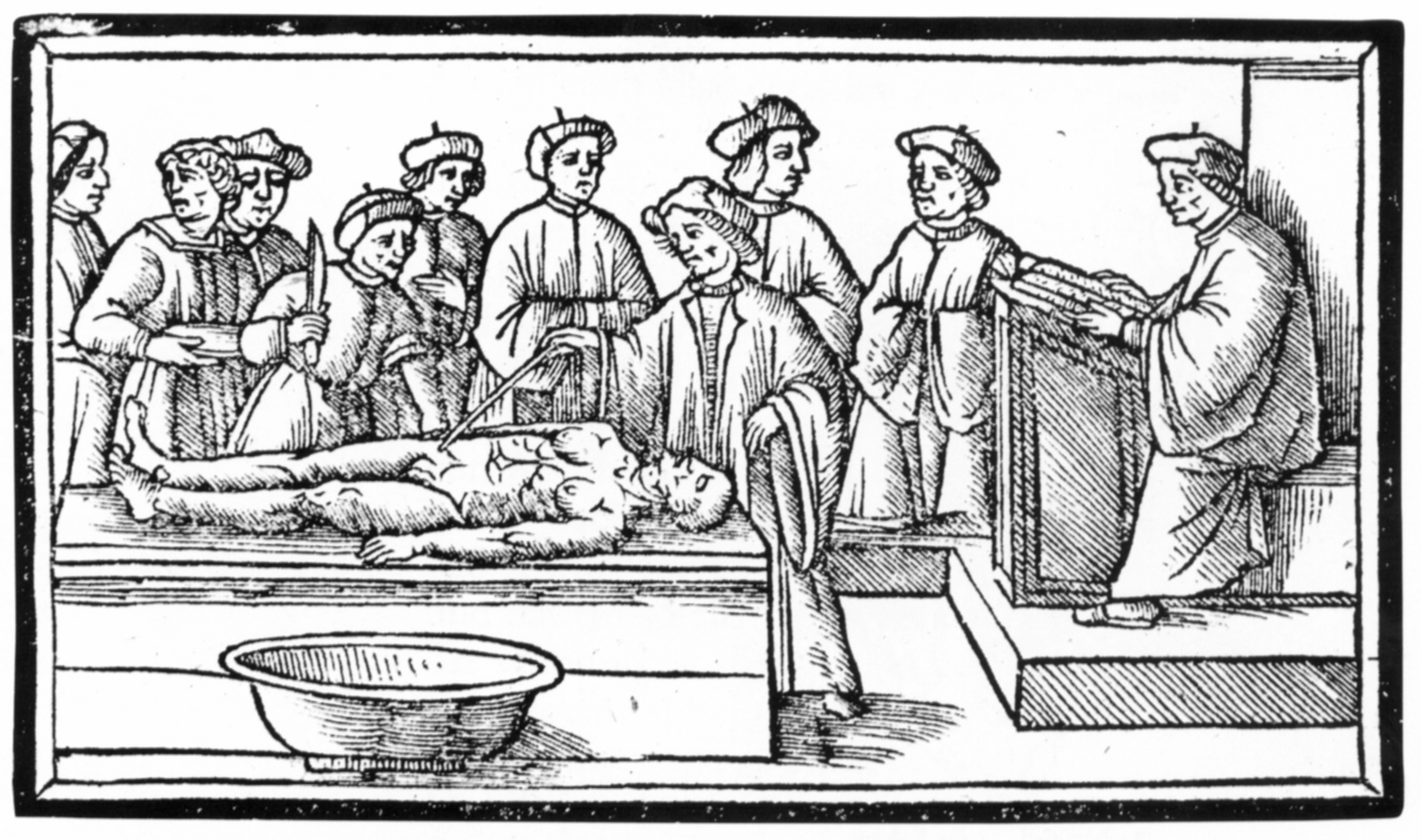

The year 1535 in science and technology included a number of events, some of which are listed here.

== Anatomy ==
- Jacopo Berengario da Carpi publishes Anatomia Carpi, the first anatomical text with illustrations, in Bologna.

== Botany ==
- Alter Botanischer Garten Tübingen established by Leonhart Fuchs.

== Exploration ==
- March 10 – Fray Tomás de Berlanga discovers the Galápagos Islands when blown off course en route to Peru.

== Births ==
- June 21 – Leonhard Rauwolf, German physician and botanist (died 1596)
- Georg Bartisch, German physician and ophthalmologist (died 1607)
- William Butler, English physician (died 1617)
- Cornelius Gemma, Flemish physician and astronomer (died 1578)
- approx. date – Giambattista della Porta, Italian physician (died 1615)

== Deaths ==
- February 18 – Heinrich Cornelius Agrippa, German alchemist (born 1486)
- March 26 − Georg Tannstetter, Austrian physician and geographer (born 1482)
