= Lionel Lockyer =

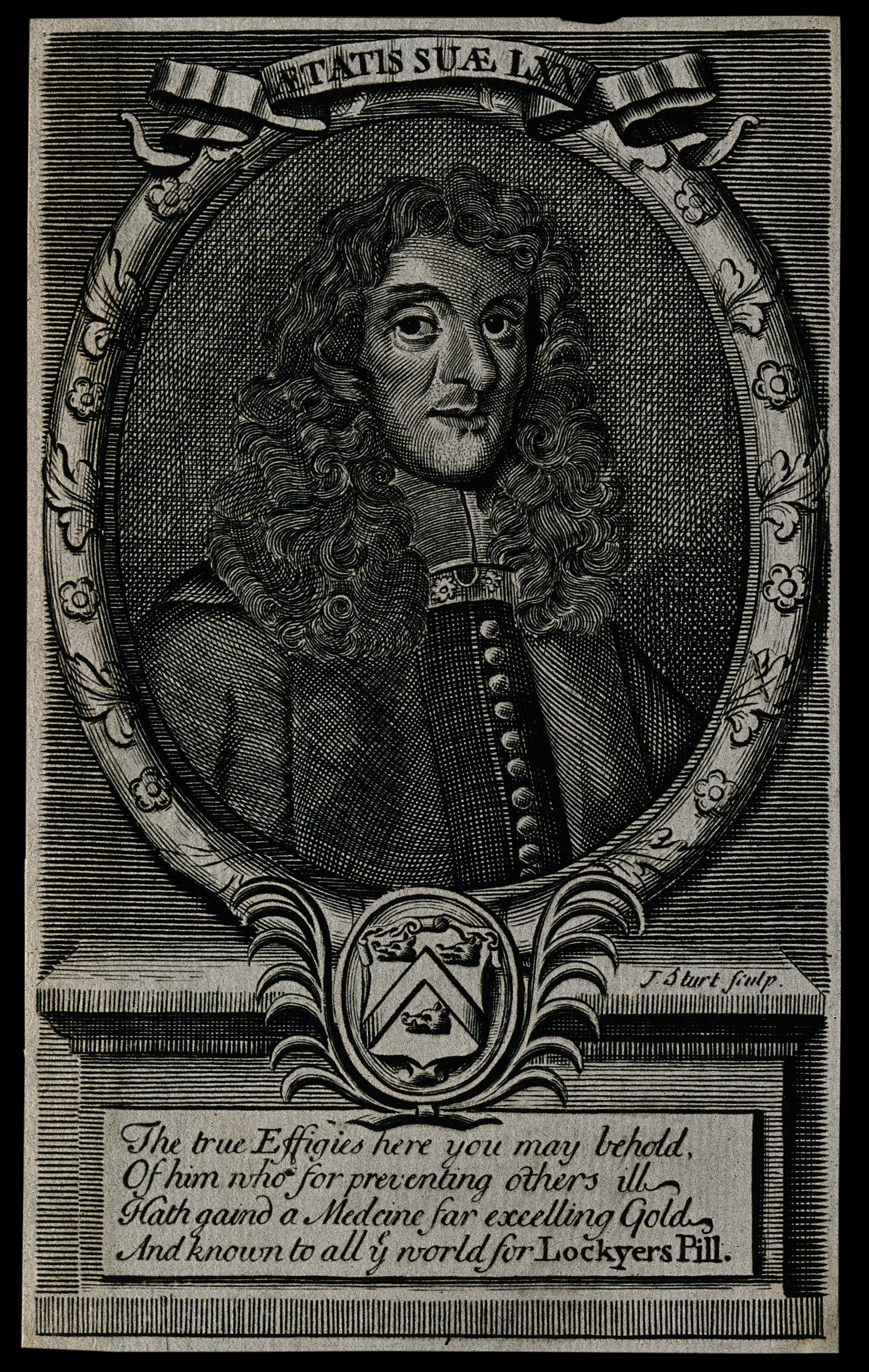
- Lionel Lockyer. Line engraving by J. Sturt. Wellcome Library collections.
- Born: c1600 Southwark
- Died: April 1672 (aged 71–72); Southwark
- Occupation: Quack doctor
- Known for: Lockyer's Pills

Lionel Lockyer, sometimes spelled Lionel Lockier, (c.1600 – 26 April 1672) was a 17th-century quack doctor famous for his miracle pills that he claimed included sunbeams as an ingredient. He was born in the Southwark area of London. He has a tomb in Southwark Cathedral.

== Life and work ==
Little reliable information exists about Lockyer's life and work. Contemporary sources primarily consist of promotional material written by Lockyer and his supporters and also of a far less flattering account given by George Starkey, an Alchemist and rival pill maker.

One advertising broadsheet, published after Lockyer's death, describes him as an "authoriz'd physician and chymist" with "at least Forty Years Experience and Practice, both in England and most Foreign Parts". It describes him as having lived in St Thomas's Southwark prior to his death.

Starkey provides an unflattering account of Lockyer's early career: Lockyer was a tailor and a butcher before turning to medicine, that he was a poor student, and that his first "invented" medicinal concoction was to add colouring to an existing common medicine. It is claimed that he also worked on making the philosopher's stone. His medical licence required his practice be at least 8 miles outside of London.

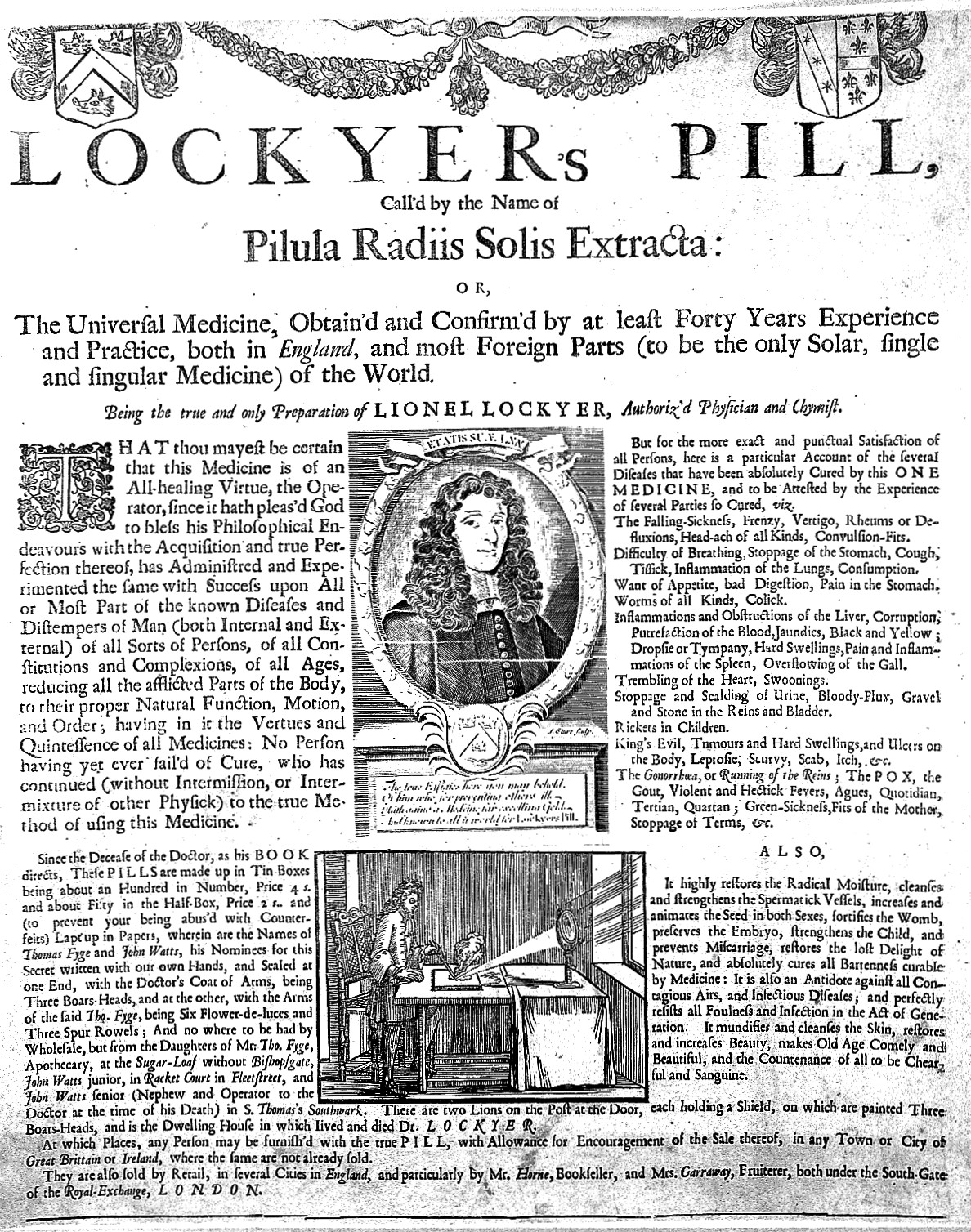
Broadsheet advertising L.Lockyer's patent medicine. Wellcome Library collections.

== Lockyer's Pill ==
Lockyer's most notable product was his eponymous pill, which his advertisements describe as:

"those most excellent Pills called, Pillulae Radijs Solis Extracta BEING an universall medicine especially in all chronical and difficult Distempers".

While the name implies that they contained an extract of sunbeams, the actual composition is unknown as Lockyer kept the recipe a secret. The pills were claimed to cure all curable ailments and to work better with larger doses. Descriptions of the effect of the pills vary, however an emetic effect was often described. One claims:

"Sometimes it works upwards and sometimes downwards, and it may be both ways at once, although it is never violent."

Lockyer had growing success selling his pills and it is claimed, in an anonymous letter of endorsement, that Lockyer had demonstrated his pills before the King at Southampton House in 1664. Lockyer also attracted the attention of rivals. George Starkey, published a tract called A smart scourge for a Silly Sawcy Fool, attacking Lockyer and casting doubt on the authenticity of the letter of endorsement. He also gives his account of Lockyer's background and mocks both his pills and the poor quality of his Latin.

== Death and monument ==
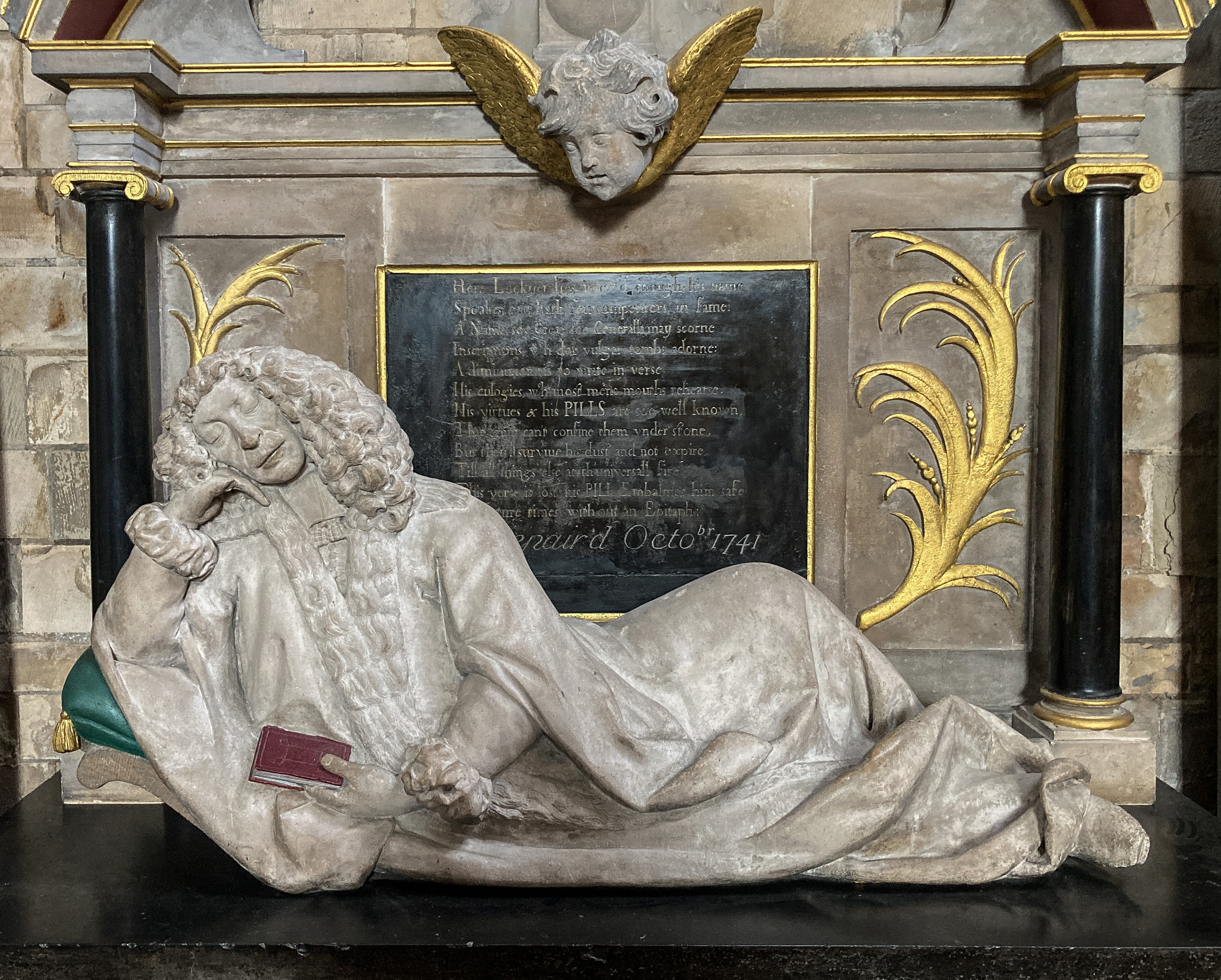
Memorial to Lionel Lockyer in Southwark Cathedral.

Lockyer died on 26 April 1672. He is interred in Southwark Cathedral where he has a prominent monument in the north transept featuring a large semi-recumbent figure of himself. The epitaph reads:

Here Lockyer: lies interr'd enough: his name
Speakes one hath few competitors in fame:
A name soe Great, soe Generall't may scorne
Inscriptions whch doe vulgar tombs adorne.
A diminution 'tis to write in verse
His eulogies whch most mens mouths rehearse.
His virtues & his PILLS are soe well known...
That envy can't confine them vnder stone.
But they'll surviue his dust and not expire
Till all things else at th'universall fire.
This verse is lost, his PILL Embalmes him safe
To future times without an Epitaph

Following Lockyer's death, his pills continued to be sold by Lockyer's nephew, John Watts, in partnership with Thomas Fyge, an apothecary. The pills were sold wholesale in tins of 50 or 100 at a price of 4 shillings for 100.
