= Luca Valerio =

Italian mathematician (1553–1618)

Luca Valerio (1553 – 16 January 1618) was an Italian mathematician. He developed ways to find volumes and centers of gravity of solid bodies using the methods of Archimedes. He corresponded with Galileo Galilei and was a member of the Accademia dei Lincei.

== Biography ==
Luca Valerio was born in Naples in 1553. He entered in the Jesuit order in 1570. He studied philosophy and theology at the Roman College as a student of Christopher Clavius, and left the Jesuits in 1580. He later taught rhetoric and Greek at the Collegio Pontifico Greco and mathematics and ethics at the Sapienza University of Rome. In 1611 Valerio obtained a position in the Vatican Library in addition to his post at Sapienza giving him close connection with the top people in the Roman Catholic church.

=== Galileo and Copernicus ===
Valerio met Galileo on a visit to Pisa in 1584. He corresponded with Galileo from 1609 until 1616 and in 1612 he became a member of the Accademia dei Lincei, a group which also included Galileo as a member. On 5 March 1616 Cardinal Robert Bellarmine, chief theologian of the Roman Catholic Church, issued a decree that the idea of a Sun centred Solar System, the Copernican system, a theory supported by Galileo, was false and erroneous. The prospect of being called before the Inquisition caused Valerio to end all correspondence with Galileo and resign from the Accademia dei Lincei. The members of the Academy looked on Valerio's actions as aligning himself with Galileo's opponents and accusing the Academy itself of committing a crime. His resignation was rejected by the Accademia, but they took away his right to participate in Accademia meetings. Federico Cesi, the Accademia dei Lincei's founder, still hoped however that Valerio could re-enter the ranks of the academics, but the mathematician died in January 1618.

Among the mathematicians who studied him and spoke highly of him were Cavalieri, Torricelli and J.-C. de la Faille. He also had a direct influence on Guldin, Gregorius Saint Vincent, and Tacquet.

== Works ==
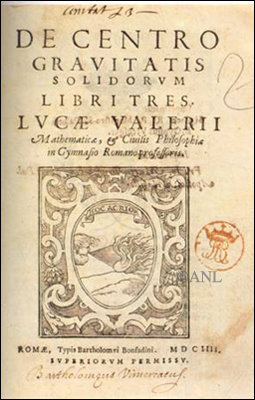
De centro gravitatis.

- Subtilium indagationum liber primus seu quadratura circuli et aliorum curvilineorum, 1582 (in Latin)
- De centro gravitatis solidorum libri tres, Rome 1604—Includes applying general methods to find volumes and centres of gravity of solid bodies. (in Latin)
  - Online: the 1661 edition
- Quadratura parabolae per simplex falsum, Rome 1606 (in Latin)

== Bibliography ==
- Conti, Lino, ed. (1992). La matematizzazione dell'universo. Momenti della cultura matematica tra '500 e '600. Assisi.
- Gabrieli, G. (1934). Luca Valerio linceo, un episodio memorabile della vecchia Accademia. Rome: Bardi.
- Napolitani, Pier Daniele (1982). "Metodo e statica in Valerio con edizione di due sue opere giovanili". Bollettino di Storia delle Scienze Matematiche. II (1): 3–86.
- Napolitani, Pier Daniele (1987). "Galileo e due matematici napoletani: Luca Valerio e Giovanni Camillo Glorioso". In Fabrizio Lomonaco; Maurizio Torrini (eds.). Galileo a Napoli. pp. 159–195.
- Baldini, Ugo; Napolitani, Pier Daniele (1991). "Per una biografia di Luca Valerio - fonti edite e inedite per una ricostruzione della sua carriera scientifica". Bollettino di Storia delle Scienze Matematiche. XI: 3–157.
- Napolitani, P. D.; Saito, K. (2004). "Royal road or labyrinth? Luca Valerio's De centro gravitatis solidorum and the beginnings of modern mathematics". Bollettino di Storia delle Scienze Matematiche. XXIV (2): 67–124. doi:10.1400/17074.
- O'Connor, John J.; Robertson, Edmund F., "Luca Valerio", MacTutor History of Mathematics Archive, University of St Andrews
