= 1590s in architecture =

List of years in architecture	(table)
- … 1580; 1581; 1582; 1583; 1584; 1585; 1586; 1587; 1588; 1589; 1590; 1591; 1592; 1593; 1594; 1595; 1596; 1597; 1598; 1599; 1600 …
- In music 1587 1588 1589 1590 1591 1592 1593 In art 1587 1588 1589 1590 1591 1592 1593
- Buildings and structures: Art; Archaeology; Architecture; Literature; Music; Philosophy; Science; +...

== Buildings and structures ==
=== Buildings ===
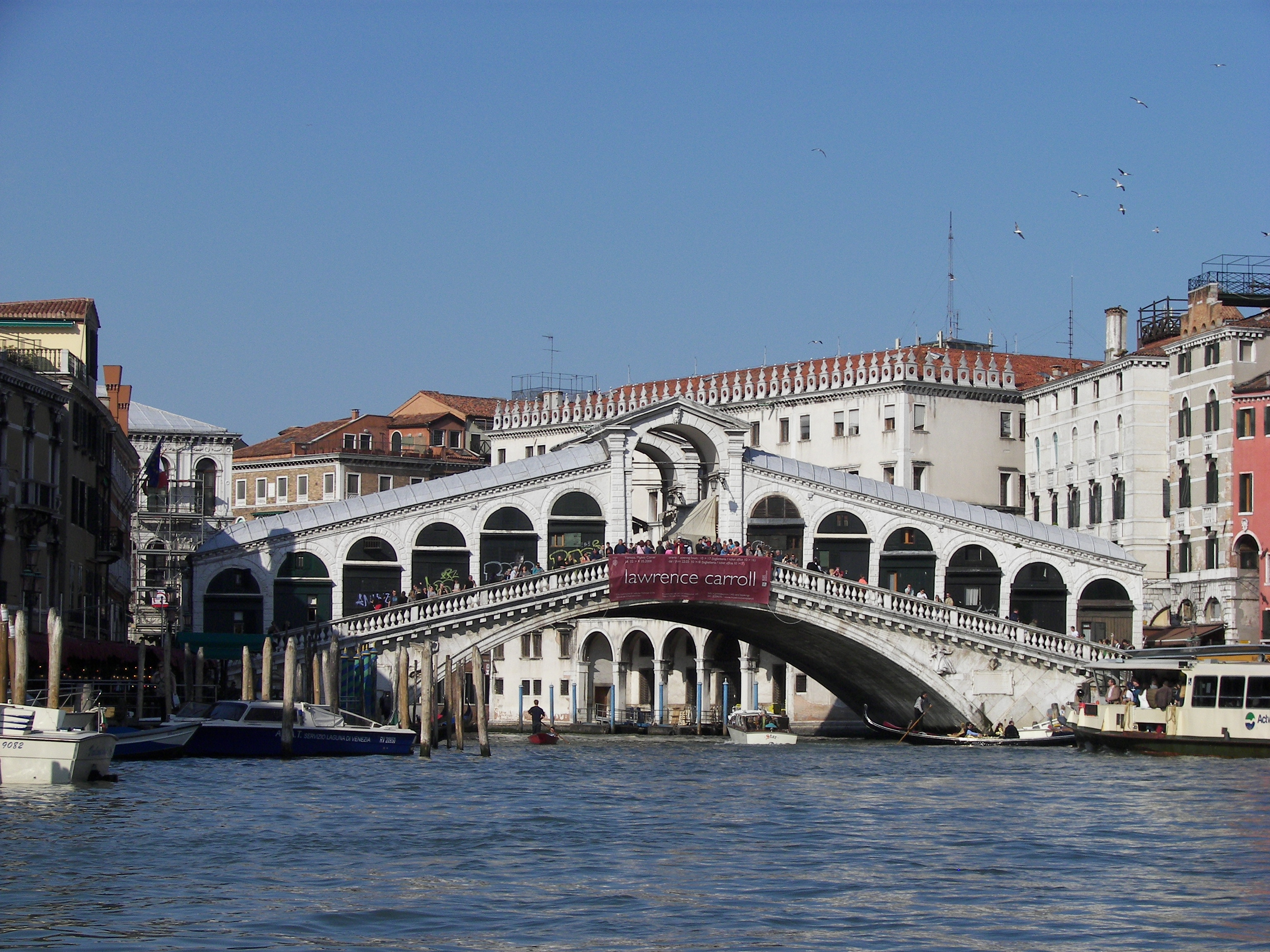
Rialto Bridge, Venice, Italy

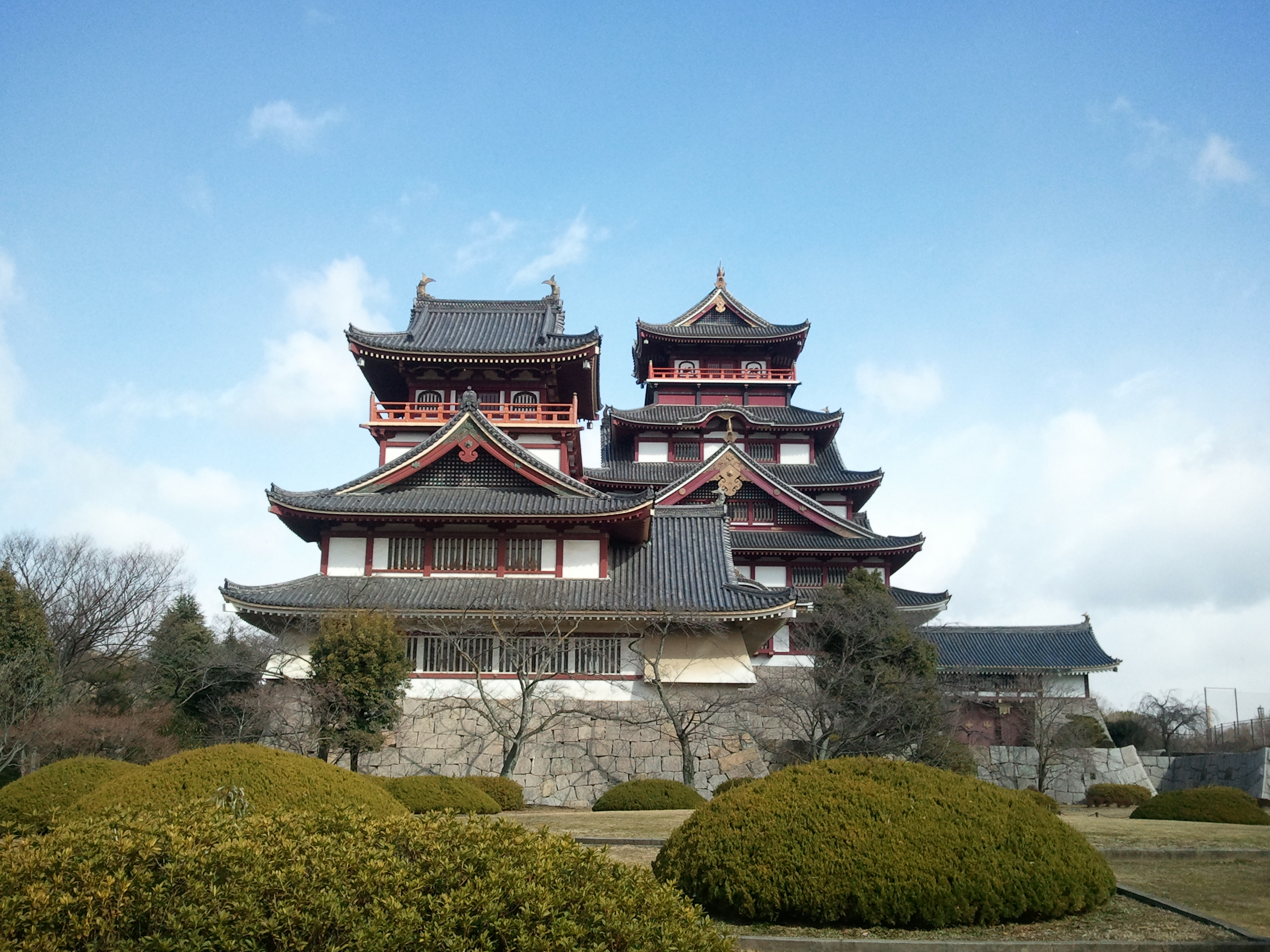
Fushimi Castle in Kyoto, Japan

- 1590
  - Sinan Pasha Mosque in Damascus, Syria, is completed.
  - Court theatre at Sabbioneta (begun 1588), designed by Vincenzo Scamozzi, is completed.
  - Church of Tolentini, Venice, Italy, is designed by Vincenzo Scamozzi; it will not be completed until 1714.
- 1590–1595 – Belvedere (fort) in Florence, Italy, designed by Bernardo Buontalenti, is constructed.
- 1590–1597 – Hardwick Hall in Derbyshire, England, designed by Robert Smythson, is constructed.
- 1591
  - Rialto Bridge in Venice, designed by Antonio da Ponte, is completed.
  - Church of San Salvatore in Lauro in Rome is designed by Ottaviano Nonni.
- 1592 – Fushimi Castle in Kyoto, Japan was begun.
- 1592 – Church of Il Redentore on Giudecca in Venice, designed by Andrea Palladio, is consecrated.
- 1592 - Crooked House of Windsor original butcher-shop building, demolished 1687, but rebuilt exactly the same way after legal complications.
- 1596 – Villa Ferretti in the Veneto, designed by Vincenzo Scamozzi, is built.
- 1596? – Kasthamandap temple in Kathmandu, Nepal.
- 1593–1597 – Rushton Triangular Lodge in Northamptonshire, England, is designed and constructed by Sir Thomas Tresham, symbolising his Catholic recusancy.
- 1597
  - Villa Molin in the Veneto, designed by Vincenzo Scamozzi, is completed.
  - Newark Castle on the Firth of Clyde in Scotland is rebuilt.
  - Ālī Qāpū imperial palace, Isfahan, Iran, is first used ceremonially.
- 1599 – In Padua (Veneto), renovation begins on the Palazzo del Capitaniato arch and clock tower (expanded 1599–1605).

== Events ==
- 1590: Giovanni Antonio Rusconi's Della architettura is published posthumously in Venice.
- 1592: May 23 – Japanese invasions of Korea (1592–98) begin, leading to the destruction by fire of many Korean buildings.

== Births ==
- 1591: December 22 – Tommaso Dingli, Maltese architect (died 1666)
- 1596
  - November 1 – Pietro da Cortona, Italian baroque architect and painter (died 1669)
  - Francesco Buonamici, Italian Baroque architect, painter and engraver (died 1677)
- 1598
  - January 13 – François Mansart, French baroque architect (died 1666)
  - December 7 – Gian Lorenzo Bernini, Italian baroque architect, sculptor and painter (died 1680)
  - Baldassarre Longhena, Venetian baroque architect (died 1682)
- 1599: September 25 – Francesco Borromini, Ticinese-born baroque architect (died 1667)

== Deaths ==
- 1592: April 13 – Bartolomeo Ammannati, Italian architect and sculptor (born 1511)
- c.1592 – Girolamo Cassar, Maltese architect (born c.1520)
- 1595 – Antonio da Ponte, Swiss-born Venetian architect (born 1512)
- 1597: January 15 – Juan de Herrera, Spanish architect and geometrician (born 1530)
