= Giovanni Antonio Magini =

Italian mathematician and astronomer (1555–1617)

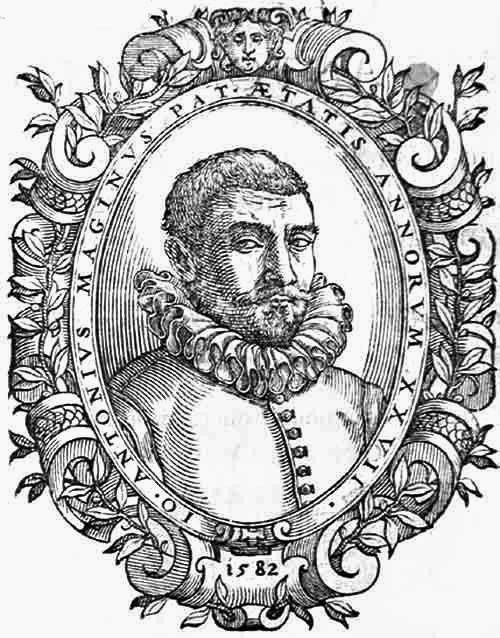
- Giovanni Antonio Magini, Italian mathematician
- Born: June 13, 1555; Padua, Republic of Venice
- Died: February 11, 1617 (aged 61); Bologna, Papal States
- Resting place: San Domenico, Bologna
- Education: University of Bologna
- Scientific career
- Fields: Astronomy; Cartography; Mathematics
- Workplaces: University of Bologna
- Academic advisors: Ignazio Danti
- Notable students: Carlo Antonio Manzini

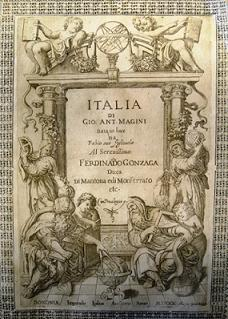
Magini's atlas.

Giovanni Antonio Magini (in Latin, Maginus) (13 June 1555 – 11 February 1617) was an Italian astronomer, astrologer, cartographer, and mathematician.

== His Life ==
He was born in Padua, and completed studies in philosophy in Bologna in 1579. His father was Pasquale Magini, a citizen of Padua. Dedicating himself to astronomy, in 1582 he wrote Ephemerides coelestium motuum, translated into Italian the following year.

In 1588 he was chosen over Galileo Galilei to occupy the chair of mathematics at the University of Bologna after the death of Egnatio Danti. He died in Bologna on 11 February 1617.

== His work ==
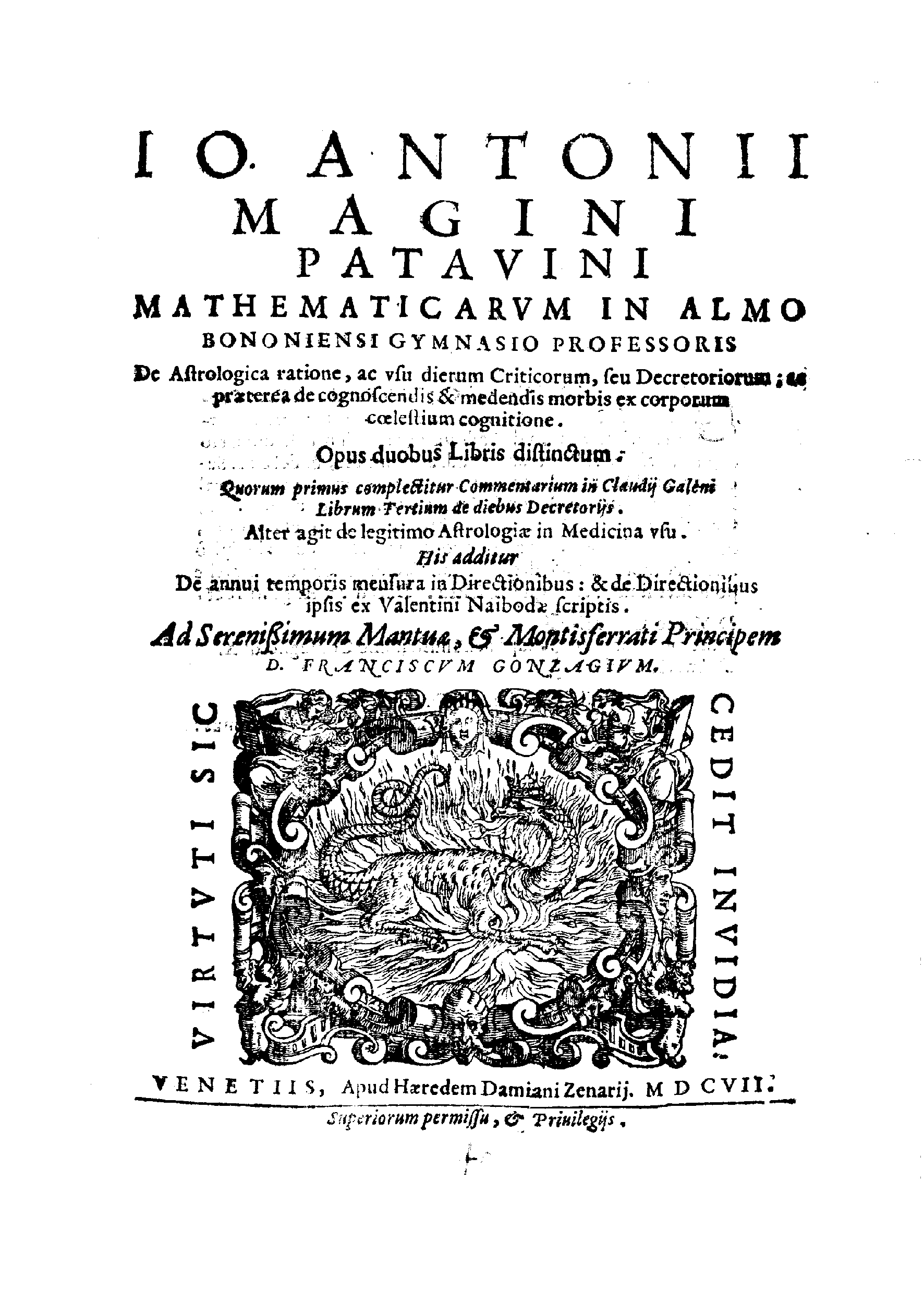
De astrologica ratione, 1607

Magini supported a geocentric system of the world, in preference to Copernicus's heliocentric system. Magini devised his own planetary theory, in preference to other existing ones. The Maginian System consisted of eleven rotating spheres, which he described in his Novæ cœlestium orbium theoricæ congruentes cum observationibus N. Copernici (Venice, 1589).

In his De Planis Triangulis (1592), he described the use of quadrants in surveying and astronomy. In 1592 Magini published Tabula tetragonica, and in 1606 devised extremely accurate trigonometric tables. He also worked on the geometry of the sphere and applications of trigonometry, for which he invented calculating devices. He also worked on the problem of mirrors and published on the theory of concave spherical mirrors.

He also published a commentary on Ptolemy’s Geographia (Venice, 1596).

As a cartographer, his life's work was the preparation of Italia or the Atlante geografico d'Italia (Geographic Atlas of Italy), printed posthumously by Magini's son in 1620. This was intended to include maps of every Italian region with exact nomenclature and historical notes. A major project, its production (begun in 1594) proved expensive and Magini assumed various additional posts in order to fund it, including becoming tutor in mathematics to the sons of Vincenzo I of Gonzaga, Duke of Mantua, a major patron of the arts and sciences. He also served as court astrologer. The Duke of Mantua, to whom the atlas is dedicated, assisted him with this project and allowed for maps of the various states of Italy to be brought to Magini. The governments of Messina and Genoa also assisted Magini financially in this project. Magini did not do any of the mapping himself.

A strong supporter of astrology, he defended its use in medicine in his De astrologica ratione (Venice, 1607). Magini collaborated closely with Valentine Naibod, and in this book he published De annui temporis mensura in Directionibus and De Directionibus from Naibod's unfinished manuscript Claudii Ptolemaei Quadripartitae Constructionis Apotelesmata Commentarius novus et Eiusdem Conversio nova. He was also interested in metoposcopy.

He corresponded with Tycho Brahe, Clavius, Abraham Ortelius, and Johann Kepler. His correspondence was edited in 1886 by Antonio Favaro. Magini was an early critic of Galileo's 1610 identification of the Galilean moons of Jupiter and lunar mountains. Magini's one-time secretary, Martin Horký, published an aggressively anti-Galilean pamphlet in 1610, though Magini cut ties with Horký shortly before it was published.

The lunar crater Maginus is named after him.

A UK Software company takes their name from the Maginus crater named in his honour.

== Works ==
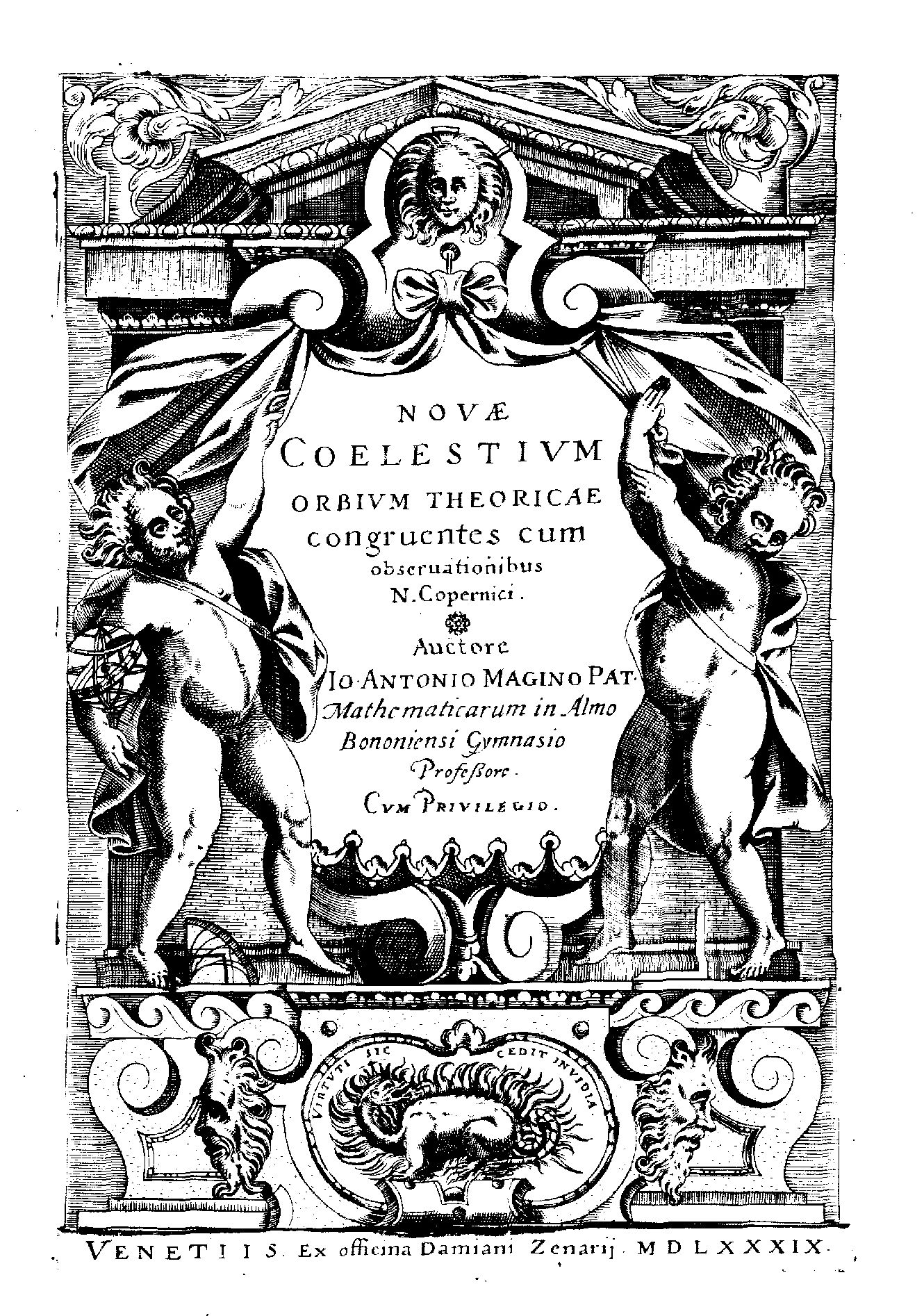
Novae coelestium orbium theoricae congruentes cum observationibus N. Copernici, 1589

- Ephemerides coelestium motuum (in Latin). Venezia: Damiano Zenaro. 1582.
- Novae coelestium orbium theoricae congruentes cum observationibus N. Copernici (in Latin). Venezia: Damiano Zenaro. 1589.
- Tabulae primi mobilis, quas directionum vulgo dicunt, quibus non solum directiones, tam secundum viam rationalem, quam iuxta Ptolemaei formam (in Latin). Venezia: Damiano Zenaro. 1604.
- Continuatio ephemeridum coelestium motuum (in Latin). Venezia: erede Damiano Zenaro. 1607.
- De astrologica ratione, ac vsu dierum criticorum, seu decretoriorum (in Latin). Venezia: erede Damiano Zenaro. 1607.
- Confutatio diatribae Ios. Scaligeri De aequinoctiorum praecessione (in Latin). Roma: Guglielmo Facciotti. 1617.
- Tabulae novae iuxta Tychonis rationes elaboratae (in Latin). Bologna: Sebastiano Bonomi. 1619.
- [Opere. Lettere e carteggi] (in Italian). Bologna: Nicola Zanichelli. 1886.

== Ptolemy's Geographia editions ==
Magini is well known for his reduced size edition of Ptolemy's Geographia published in Italian as "Geografia cioe Descrittione Universale della Terra"

- 1596 Venice. Latin text. Printer Heredes Simoni Galignani. 64 copper-plate maps.
- 1597 Cologne. Latin text. Printer Petrus Keschedt. 64 copper-plate maps.
- 1598 Venice. Italian text. Printer Gio. Battista & Giorgio Galignani Fratelli. Artist Girolamo Porro. 64 copper-plate maps.
- 1608 Cologne. Latin text. Printer Antonius Becker. 63 copper-plate maps.
- 1617 Arnheim. Latin text. Printer Ioannes Ianssonius. 64 copper-plate maps.
- 1621 Padua. Italian text. Printer Paolo and Francesco Galignani. 64 copper-plate maps.

== Gallery ==
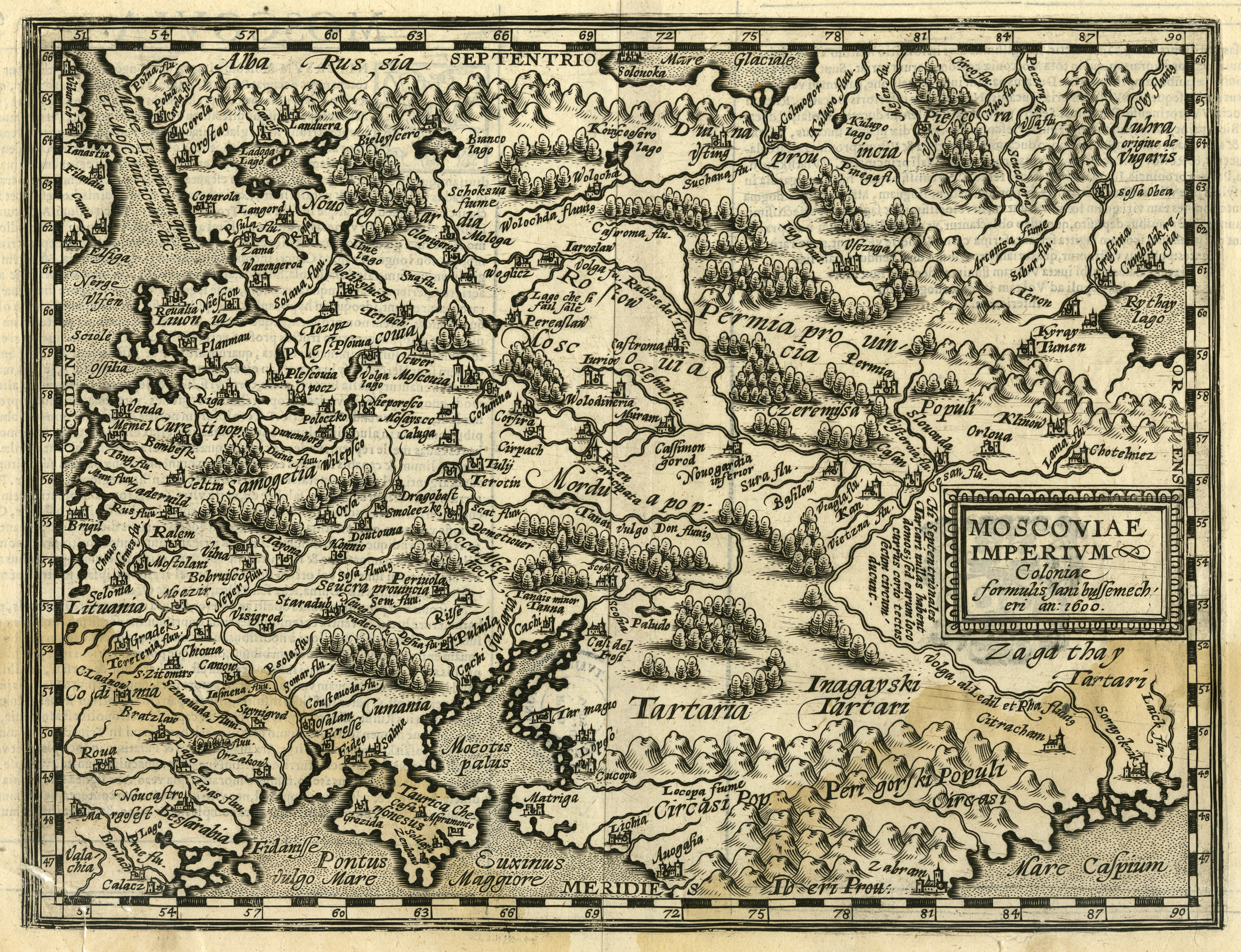

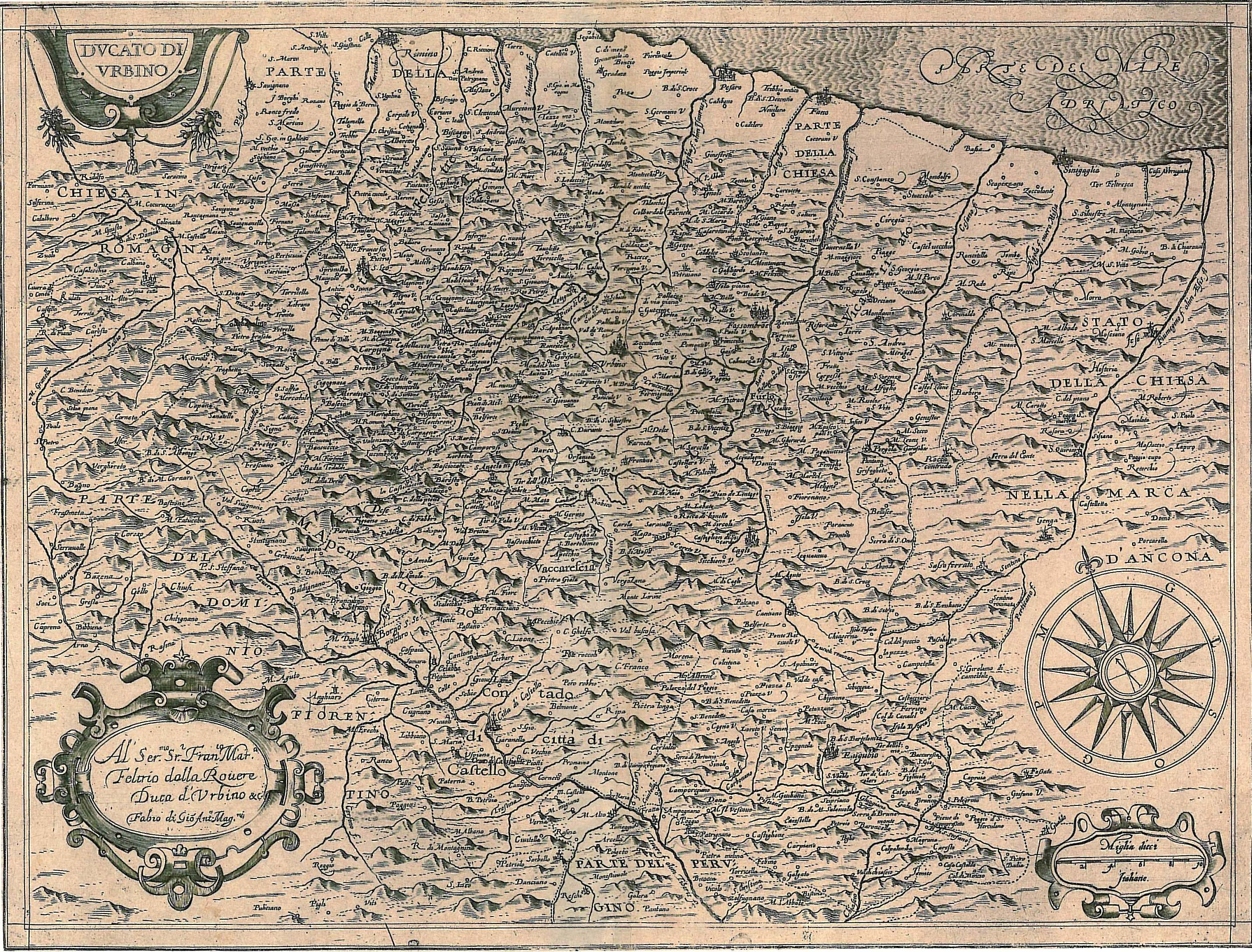

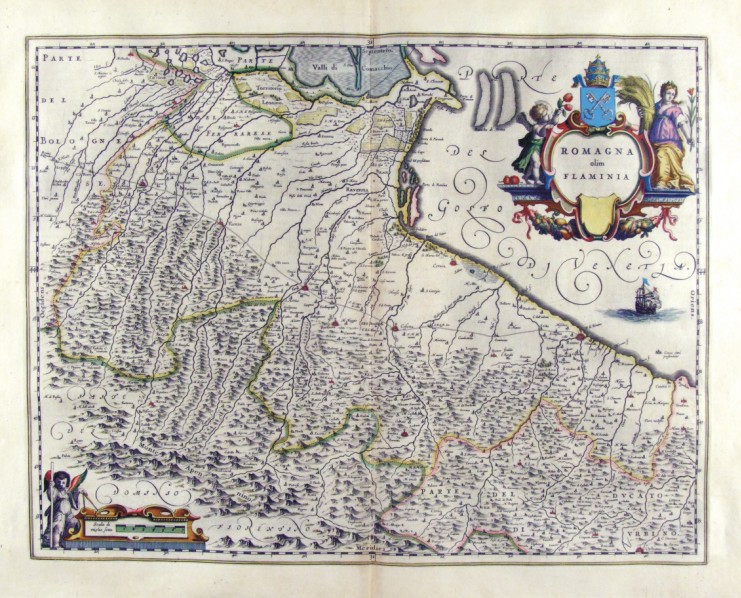

== Bibliography ==
- Baldini, Ugo (2006). "MAGINI, Giovanni Antonio". Dizionario Biografico degli Italiani (in Italian). Vol. 67: Macchi–Malaspina. Rome: Istituto dell'Enciclopedia Italiana. ISBN 978-88-12-00032-6.
- Biografie: Giovanni Antonio Magini, Mille Anni di Scienza in Italia, Ministero dell'Università e della Ricerca Scientifica e Tecnologica, Italy, retrieved 2014-02-05.
- Meliconi, Ilaria (Spring 1999), "Epact Unpacked: The Quadrants of Giovanni Magini", Sphaera: The Newsletter of the Museum of the History of Science, Oxford (9)
- O'Connor, John J.; Robertson, Edmund F., "Giovanni Antonio Magini", MacTutor History of Mathematics Archive, University of St Andrews
