= 1592 in science =

The year 1592 in science and technology involved some significant events.

== Astronomy ==
- November–December – Appearance of the Guest stars observed by Korean astronomers.

== Biology ==
- Prospero Alpini publishes De Plantis Aegypti liber in Venice.

== Geography ==
- August 9 – English explorer John Davis, commander of the Desire, probably discovers the Falkland Islands.
- An abridgement of Muhammad al-Idrisi's 12th-century geographical compilation is published as De geographia universali or Kitāb Nuzhat al-mushtāq fī dhikr al-amṣār wa-al-aqṭār wa-al-buldān wa-al-juzur wa-al-madā’ in wa-al-āfāq in Rome.

== Mathematics ==
- March 14 – Ultimate 'Pi Day': the largest correspondence between calendar dates and significant digits of pi since the introduction of the Julian calendar.
- Giovanni Antonio Magini publishes De Planis Triangulis, describing use of the quadrant in surveying and astronomy, and Tabula tetragonica.

== Physics ==
- Galileo invents the thermometer.

== Technology ==
- March – Korean Admiral Yi Sun-sin perfects the armed turtle ship.

== Institutions ==
- Trinity College Dublin is established.

== Births ==
- April 22 – Wilhelm Schickard, German inventor of the first mechanical calculator (died 1635)

== Deaths ==
- May – Sir Thomas Cavendish, English explorer (born 1560)
- October 14 - Urbain Hémard, French physician and dentist (born circa 1548)
- Pedro Sarmiento de Gamboa, Spanish explorer and scientist (born 1532)
