= 1610s in architecture =

== Events ==
- 27 April 1613 – Inigo Jones is appointed Surveyor of the King's Works in England.
- September 1615 – Inigo Jones, newly returned from a tour of continental Europe, is appointed Surveyor-General of the King's Works in England.

== Buildings and structures ==
=== Buildings ===
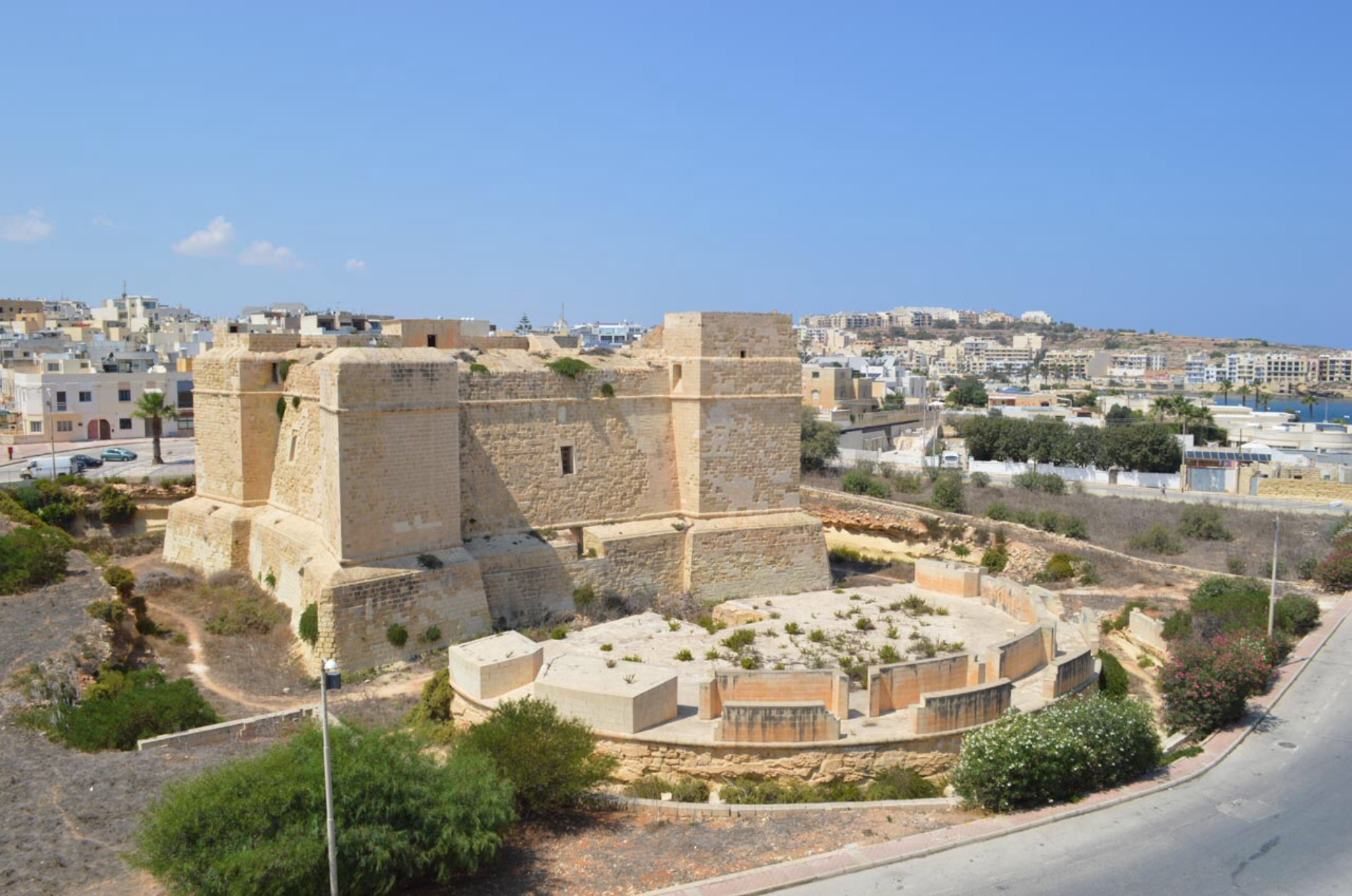
Saint Thomas Tower in Marsaskala, Malta

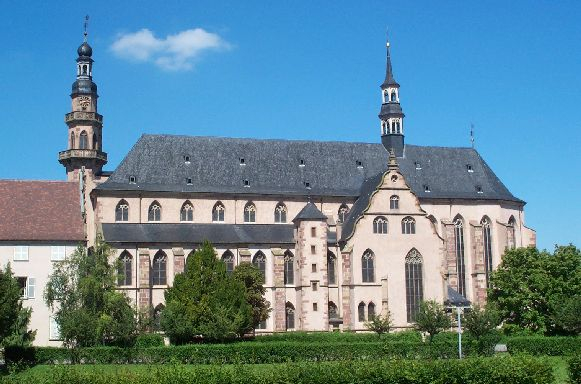
Jesuit Church, Molsheim, France

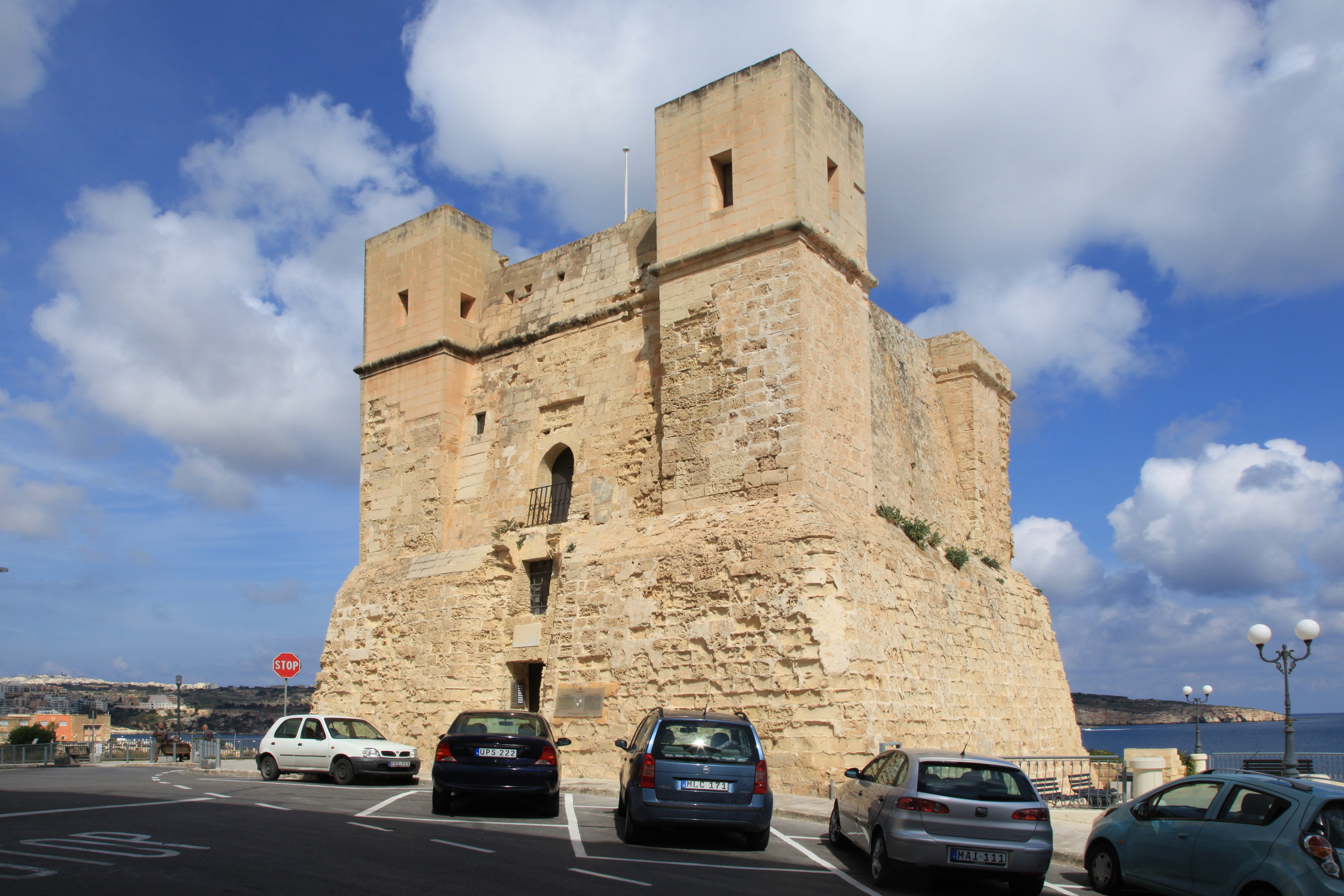
Wignacourt Tower in St. Paul's Bay, Malta

- 1610
  - The Changdeokgung of Korea is reconstructed.
  - The Church of San Giorgio Maggiore in Venice, Italy, designed by Palladio is completed.
  - Fellows' Quad, Merton College, Oxford in England is completed.
  - Wignacourt Tower is built in St. Paul's Bay, Malta.
- 1611
  - The Catholic church of Virgen del Rosario is built in Benejúzar, Spain.
  - The Deoksugung of Korea is completed.
  - The University of Santo Tomas is completed in Manila, Philippines.
  - Saint Lucian Tower in Marsaxlokk, Malta is completed (begun in 1610).
- 1612 – Work starts on Bolsover Castle in the north midlands of England, designed by Robert Smythson.
- 1613 – Santa Cecilia Tower, Għajnsielem, Gozo, Malta, built.
- 1614
  - The Marian column in front of the Basilica di Santa Maria Maggiore in Rome, designed by Carlo Maderno, is built; it serves as a model for numerous Marian columns in many Catholic countries.
  - The Schloss Johannisburg in Aschaffenburg, Bavaria, designed by Georg Ridinger, is completed (begun in 1605).
  - Work starts on Saint Thomas Tower in Marsaskala, Malta.
- 1615
  - Work starts on the Jesuit Church, Molsheim (consecrated in 1618).
  - The Wignacourt Aqueduct in Malta is completed (begun in 1610).
- 1616
  - Work starts on the Queen's House in Greenwich, England, designed by Inigo Jones as the first major example of classical architecture in the country (work is suspended in 1619 and resumed 1630–38).
  - The Church of San Pablo in Valladolid is completed.
  - The Sultan Ahmed Mosque ("Blue Mosque") in Istanbul is completed.
  - The Gyeonghuigung of Korea is completed.
  - The Changgyeonggung of Korea is reconstructed.
  - Marsalforn Tower in Gozo, Malta, is completed (begun c.1614).
- 1617 – The Basilica Palladiana in Vicenza, Italy, designed by Andrea Palladio, is completed (begun in 1549).
- 1618
  - Saint Mary's Tower in Comino, Malta, is completed.
  - Parlement de Bretagne in Rennes, designed by Salomon de Brosse, is built.
  - Jo-an chashitsu is erected in Kyoto.
- 1619
  - The Banqueting House at Whitehall in London and the Prince's Lodging at Newmarket, Suffolk in England, both designed by Inigo Jones, are begun.
  - Naghsh-i Jahan Square is built in Isfahan, Iran by Mohammadreza Isfahani.
  - Remodelling of Plaza Mayor, Madrid, is completed by Juan Gómez de Mora.
  - Ballintaylor House at Whitechurch, Waterford, Ireland, is built by Sir Richard Osbourne.
  - Château of Blérancourt in France, designed by Salomon de Brosse, is built about this date.
  - Hôtel de Ville, Benfeld, then in the Holy Roman Empire, now in France, is completed.

== Publications ==
- 1615 – Vincenzo Scamozzi – L'Idea della Architettura Universale (The Universal Idea of Architecture)

== Births ==
- 4 May 1611 – Carlo Rainaldi (died 1691)
- 1611 – John Webb (died 1672)
- 1612 – Louis Le Vau (died 1670)
- 1613 – Claude Perrault (died 1688)

== Deaths ==
- 7 August 1616 – Vincenzo Scamozzi (born 1548)
- 1617 – Sedefkar Mehmed Agha (born c.1540)
