= 1617 in science =

The year 1617 in science and technology involved some significant events.

== Astronomy ==
- Johannes Kepler begins to publish his Epitome astronomiæ Copernicanæ setting out his theory of elliptic orbits.

== Mathematics ==
- Napier's Bones, a multiplication device invented by John Napier (who dies on April 4), is described in his Rabdologiæ, published in Edinburgh.
- Henry Briggs publishes Logarithmorum Chilias Prima, a modification of Napier's logarithms into common logarithms.

== Medicine ==
- The Worshipful Society of Apothecaries of London is granted a royal charter, separating it from the Grocers.

== Births ==
- July 13 (bapt.) – Ralph Cudworth, Cambridge Platonist (died 1688).

== Deaths ==
- January 29 – William Butler, Irish alchemist (at sea) (born c. 1534).
- February 6 – Prospero Alpini, Italian physician and botanist (born 1553).
- February 11 – Giovanni Antonio Magini, Italian astronomer (born 1555).
- April 4 – John Napier of Merchiston, mathematician (born 1550).
- May 7 – David Fabricius, Frisian astronomer (born 1564).
- December – William Butler, English physician (born 1535).
