= 1595 in science =

The year 1595 in science and technology involved some significant events, some of which are listed here.

== Chemistry ==
- Andreas Libavius publishes Opera omnia medico-chymica.

== Exploration ==
- July 21 – A Spanish expedition led by Álvaro de Mendaña de Neira makes the first European landing in Polynesia, on the Marquesas Islands.
- Sir Walter Raleigh explores Guyana and eastern Venezuela.

== Mathematics ==
- Bartholomaeus Pitiscus publishes Trigonometria: sive de solutione triangulorum tractatus brevis et perspicuus in Heidelberg, introducing the term trigonometry to Western European languages.

== Medicine ==
- 1595–1596 – Scipione (Girolamo) Mercurio publishes La commare o riccoglitrice ("The midwife"), the first text to advocate a Caesarean section on the living in cases of a contracted long pelvis.
- A first chair of medicine is created at Uppsala in Sweden. It will remain vacant until the appointment, in 1613, of Johannes Chesnecopherus.

== Technology ==
- Hull of first fluyt laid in the Dutch Republic.

== Births ==
- June 13 – Jan Marek Marci, Bohemian physician (died 1667).
- Cornelius Vermuyden, Dutch drainage engineer (died 1677).

== Deaths ==
- August 24 – Thomas Digges, English astronomer (born 1546).
- November 12 – Sir John Hawkins, English navigator (born 1532) (at sea).
