= 1600s in architecture =

== Buildings and structures ==
=== Buildings ===
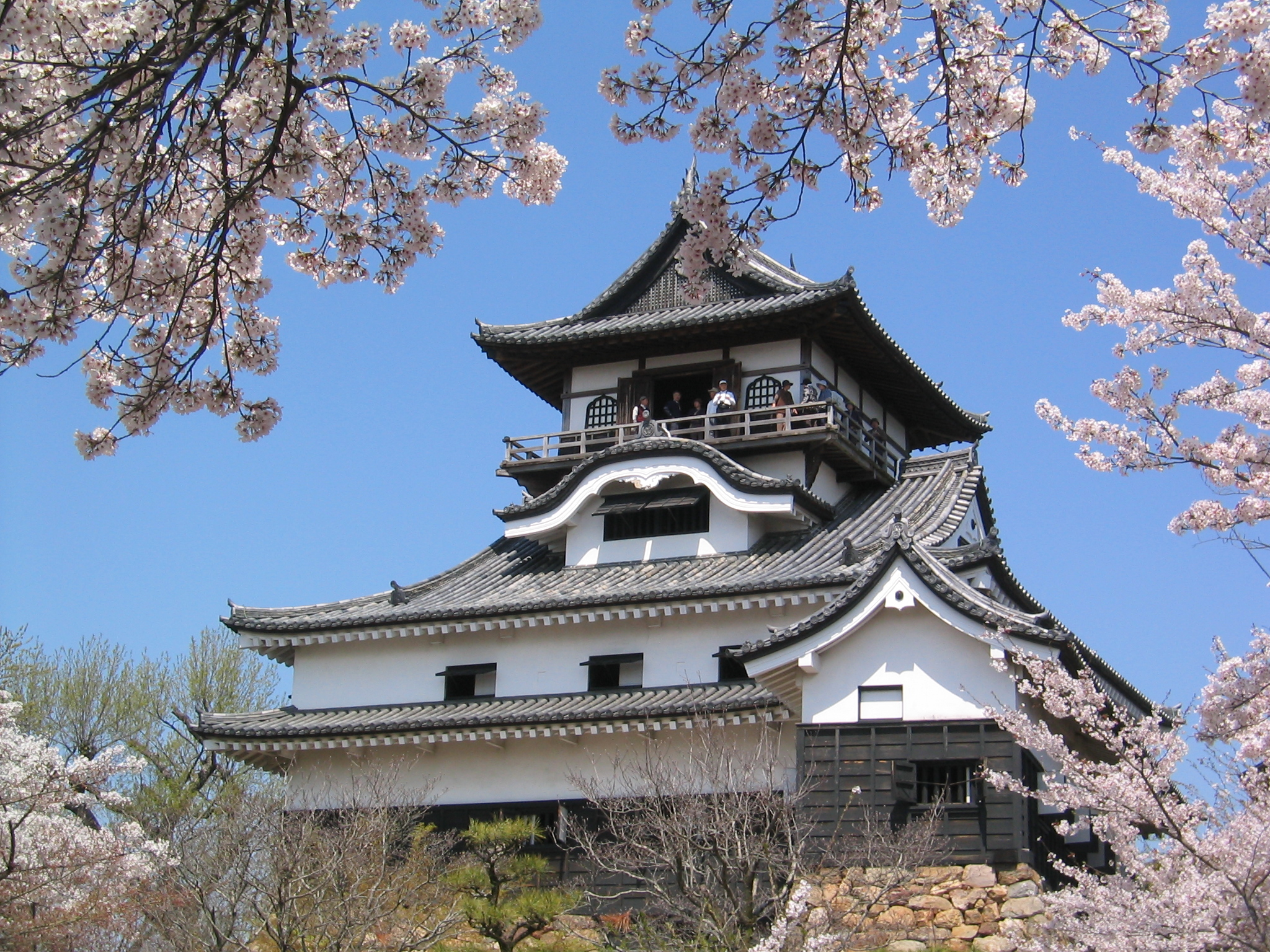
Inuyama Castle in Aichi Prefecture, Japan

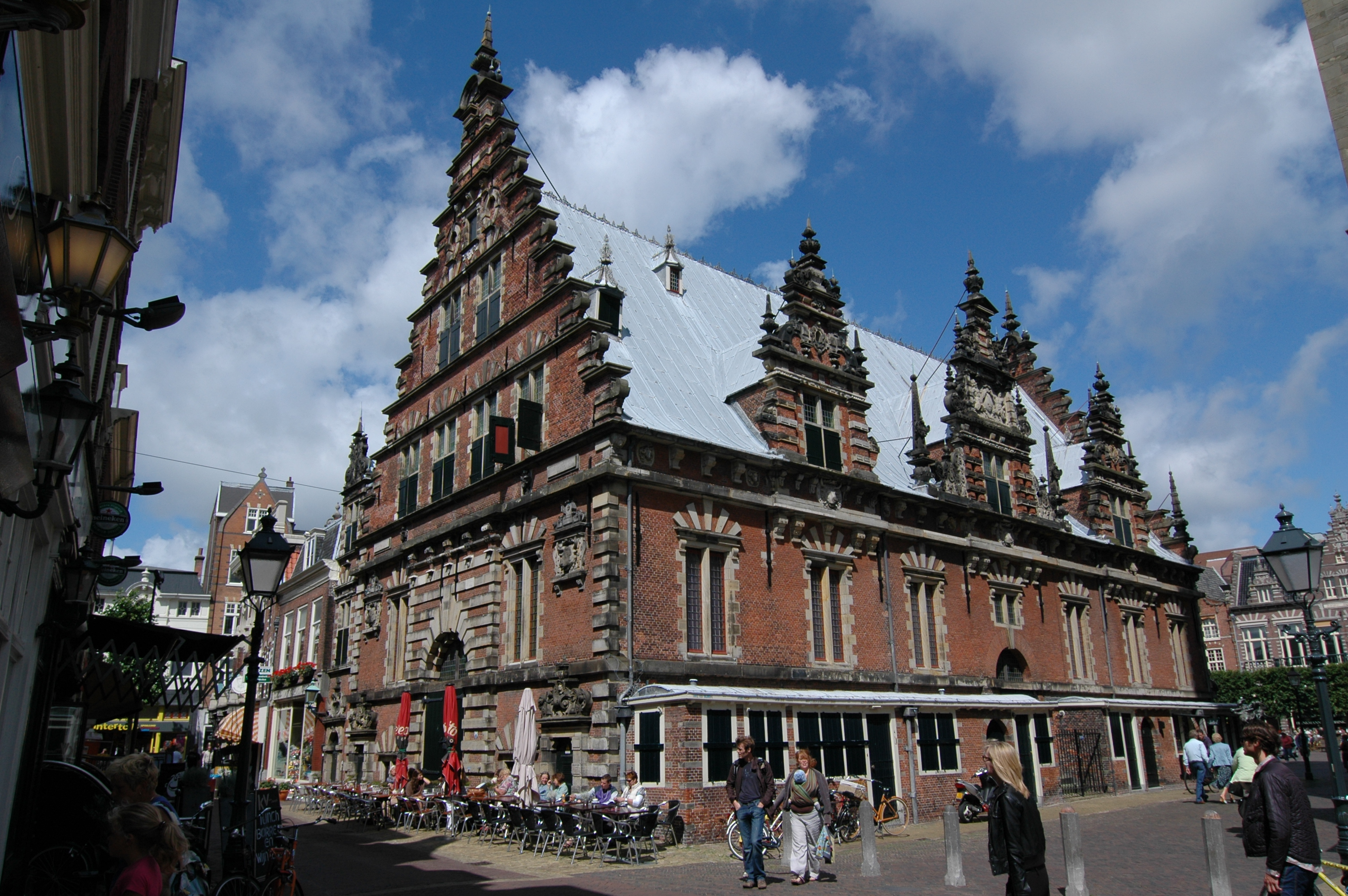
Vleeshal, Haarlem

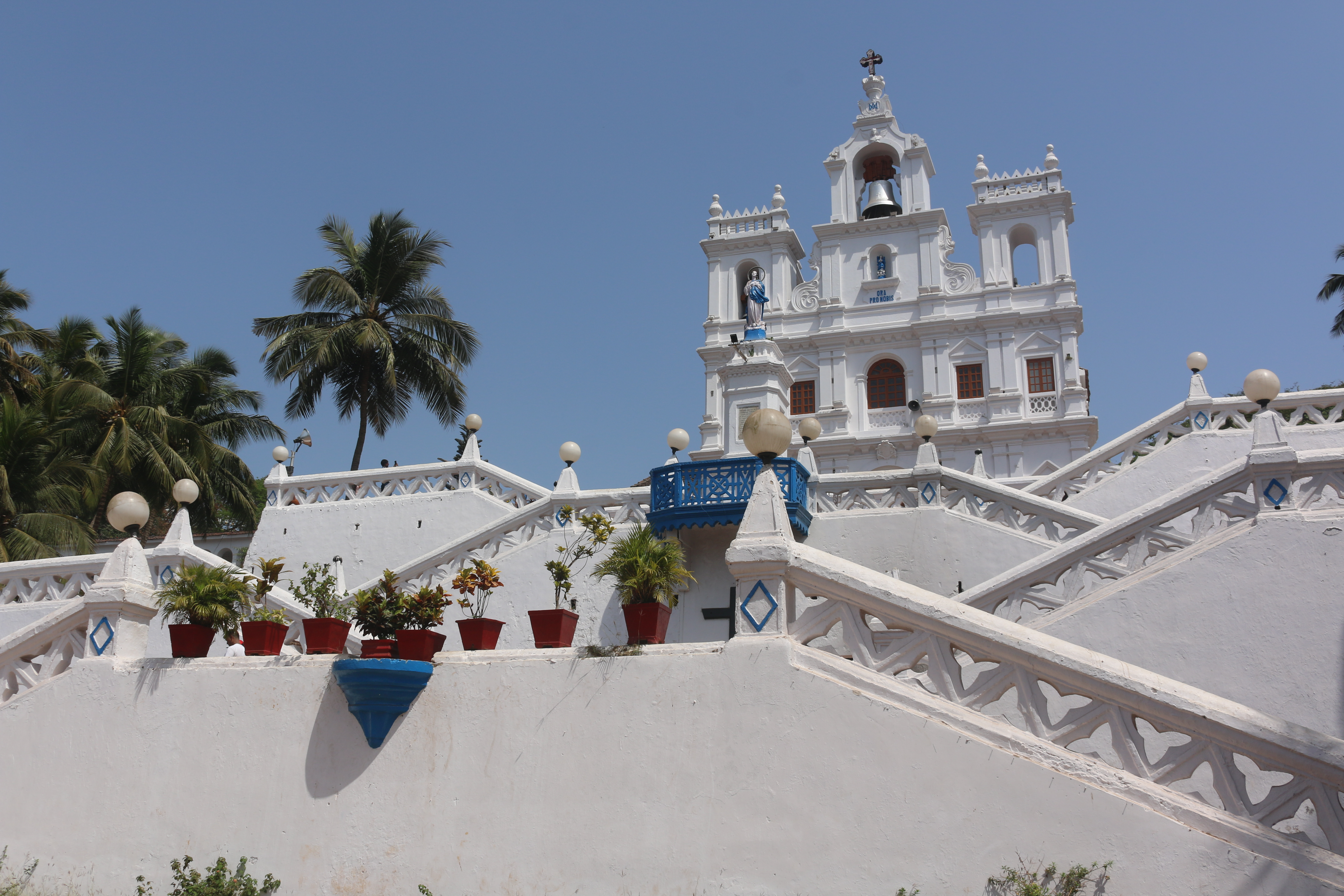
The Our Lady of the Immaculate Conception Church, Goa

Construction (by year):

- 1601
  - Jerónimos Monastery at Belém (Lisbon) in Portugal is completed after 100 years.
  - In Naples (Italy), the Fontana dell'Immacolatella, made of white and gray marble, is built by Michelangelo Naccherino and Pietro Bernini; it is adorned with coats of arms and eagles, and the central coat of arms is upheld by two angels.
  - In Japan, Inuyama Castle is built in Aichi Prefecture (remodeled in 1620).
- 1602–1604 – Vleeshal, Haarlem, North Holland, designed by Lieven de Key, built.
- 1604
  - August – In Amritsar, Punjab, the Harmandir Sahib is inaugurated.
  - In Korea, Bulguksa is reconstructed.
  - In Paris (France), the Pont Neuf over the Seine (begun in 1578 by Jean Baptiste Androuet du Cerceau) is opened to traffic (completed in July 1606; royal inauguration in 1607).
- 1605
  - In Gdańsk, the Old Arsenal, designed by Anthony van Obberghen, Jan Strakowski and Abraham van den Blocke, is completed.
  - In Padua (Veneto), renovation is finished on the Palazzo del Capitanio palace arch and Torre dell'Orologio clock tower (expanded 1599–1605).
  - In Rome, building is begun on Santa Maria della Vittoria (as San Paolo), designed by Carlo Maderno.
  - In England, the Red Hall at Bourne, Lincolnshire, is built.
  - In India, the Jahangir Mahal, Orchha, is built.
- 1607
  - January 19 – San Agustin Church (Manila), designed by Juan Macías, is completed.
- 1608
  - In England, The Great Hall, the first part of the mansion house of Bank Hall in Bretherton, Lancashire, is constructed.
  - In Korea, Jongmyo is reconstructed.
- 1609 – Our Lady of the Immaculate Conception Church, Goa.

== Births ==
- 1606
  - Charles Errard, French painter, architect and engraver (died 1689)
  - Giovanni Francesco Grimaldi, Italian architect and painter (died 1680)

== Deaths ==
- 1604 – Giacomo del Duca, Italian sculptor and architect (born c. 1520)
- 1607: July 24 – Alessandro Pieroni, Italian mannerist painter and architect (born 1550)
- 1607 or 1609 – Vittorio Cassar, Maltese architect (born c. 1550)
- 1608: June 25 or 26 – Bernardo Buontalenti, Florentine mannerist architect, stage designer, military engineer and artist (born c. 1531)
