= 1615 in science =

The year 1615 in science and technology involved some significant events.

== Astronomy ==
- Manuel Dias (Yang MaNuo), a Portuguese Jesuit missionary introduces for the first time in China the telescope in his book Tian Wen Lüe (Explicatio Sphaerae Coelestis).

== Chemistry ==
- Jean Beguin publishes an edition of his chemistry textbook Tyrocinium Chymicum including the first-ever chemical equation.

== Mathematics ==
- Summer – Henry Briggs meets John Napier for the first time in Edinburgh.
- Kepler publishes Nova Stereometria (the first book printed in Linz), a significant work in pre-calculus integration.

== Natural history ==
- Posthumous publication in Mexico of Plantas y Animales de la Nueva Espana, y sus virtudes por Francisco Hernández, y de Latin en Romance por Fr. Francisco Ximenez.

== Physiology and medicine ==
- Helkiah Crooke's Mikrokosmographia, a Description of the Body of Man, together with the controversies and figures thereto belonging; collected and translated out of all the best authors of anatomy, especially out of Gasper Bauhinus and Andreas Laurentius is published "by the Kings Maiesties especiall direction and warrant" by Crooke's patient, the printer William Jaggard, in London.

== Technology ==
- The first known solar-activated device, a water pumping machine, is invented by Salomon de Caus.
- Approximate date – Croatian polymath Fausto Veranzio publishes Machinae Novae in Venice depicting around 50 machines and devices.

== Births ==
- Nicasius le Febure, French chemist (died 1669)
- Frans van Schooten, Dutch mathematician who popularizes the analytic geometry of Descartes (died 1660)

== Deaths ==
- February 4 – Giambattista della Porta, Italian physician (born c. 1535)
- May 4 – Adriaan van Roomen, Flemish mathematician (born 1561)
- October 9 − Heo Jun, Korean physician (born 1546)
- November – Edward Wright, English mathematician (born 1561)
- November 24 – Sethus Calvisius, German musician and astronomer (born 1556)
- Timothy Bright, English physician (born c. 1551)
- Giovanni Tommaso Minadoi, Italian historian and physician
