= 1614 in science =

The year 1614 in science and technology involved some significant events.

== Exploration ==
- July – Dutch merchant Adriaen Block returns to Amsterdam in the Onrust, having become the first European to enter Long Island Sound and the Connecticut River, and determined that Long Island is an island. He publishes a map of New Netherland.

== Mathematics ==
- Scottish mathematician John Napier publishes Mirifici Logarithmorum Canonis Descriptio ("Description of the Admirable Table of Logarithms"), outlining his discovery of logarithms and incorporating the decimal mark. Astronomer Johannes Kepler soon begins to employ logarithms in his description of the Solar System.

== Medicine ==
- Felix Plater gives a description of Dupuytren's contracture.
- Sanctorius publishes De statica medicina, which will go through five editions in the following century.

== Births ==
- February 14 – Bishop John Wilkins, English natural philosopher, co-founder of the Royal Society (died 1672)

== Deaths ==
- July 28 – Felix Plater, Swiss physician (born 1536)
- Pedro Fernandes de Queirós, Portuguese-born navigator (born 1565)
- William Lee, English-born inventor (born c. 1563)
