= 1613 in science =

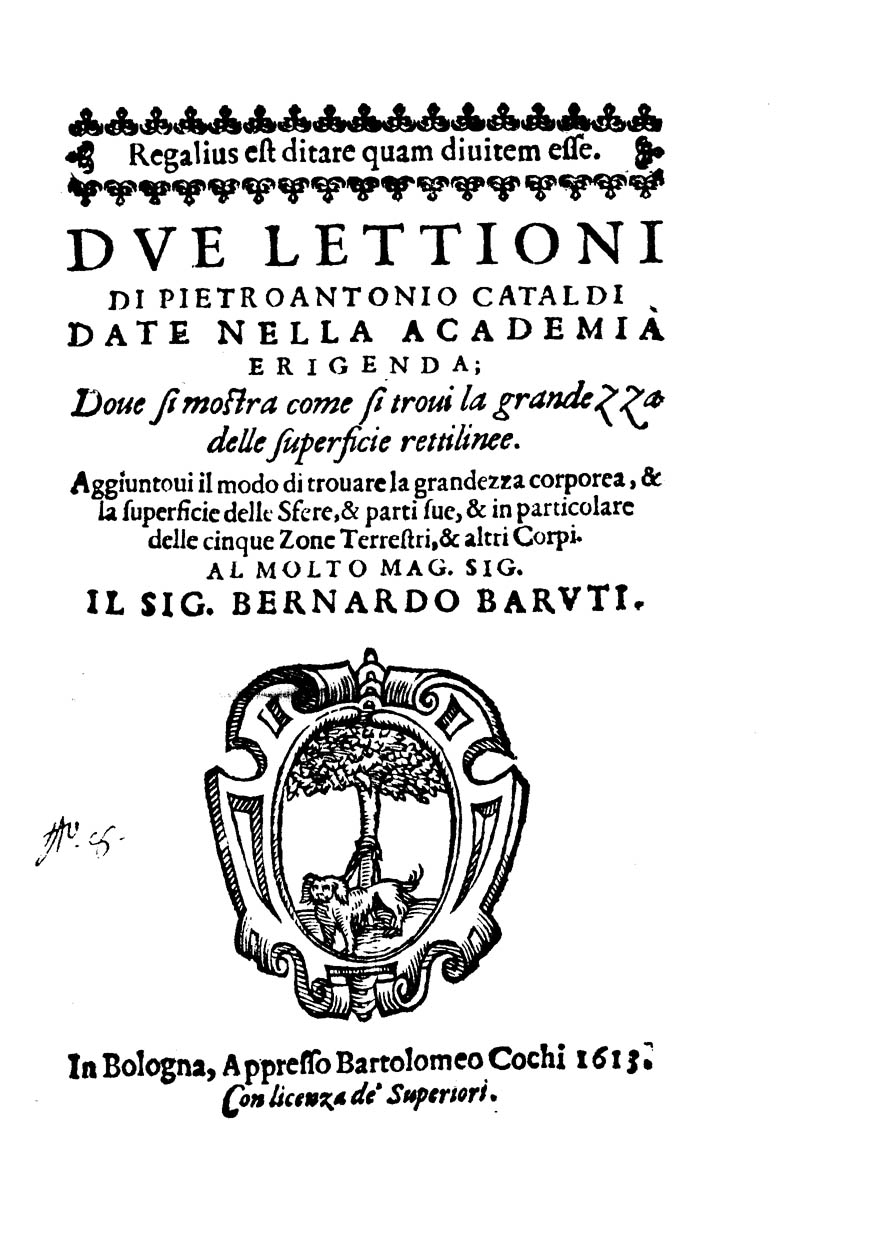
Two lectures by Pietro Antonio Cataldi given in the Academy being erected where it is shown how to find the size of rectilinear surfaces, Bologna, 1613.

The year 1613 in science and technology involved some significant events.

== Astronomy ==
- Galileo Galilei publishes Letters on Sunspots, the first major work on the topic.

== Paleontology ==
- Bones, probably of an elephant, are found in France but at first interpreted to belong to a giant human.

== Technology ==
- September 29 – The New River (engineered by Sir Hugh Myddelton) is opened to supply London with drinking water from Hertfordshire.

== Births ==
- March 6 – Stjepan Gradić, Ragusan polymath (died 1683)
- September 25 – Claude Perrault, French architect and physicist (died 1688)

== Deaths ==
- June 16 – Jakob Christmann, German orientalist and astronomer (born 1554)
- July 2 – Bartholomaeus Pitiscus, German trigonometrist (born 1561)
- August 25 – David Gans, German Jewish mathematician and astronomer (born 1541)
- Mathew Baker, English shipwright (born 1530)
- Johann Bauhin, Swiss physician and botanist (born 1541)
- Jacques Guillemeau, French surgeon (born 1550)
