= 1600 in science =

The year 1600 CE in science and technology included some significant events.

== Astronomy ==
- January 1 – Scotland adopts January 1st as being New Year's Day.
- February 4 – Johannes Kepler joins Tycho Brahe as his assistant at the castle of Benátky, near Prague.
- February 17 – Giordano Bruno is burned at the stake for heresy in Rome.
- July – Danish astronomer Longomontanus arrives in Prague, where he works with the Moon orbital theory; he brings the rest of Tycho's astronomical instruments with him.

== Biology ==
- University of Copenhagen Botanical Garden established.
- Olivier de Serres publishes Le Théâtre d'Agriculture in France.
- First recorded use of the word Naturalist in its modern English sense, in Christopher Sutton's Disce Mori.

== Earth sciences ==
- February 19 – The Peruvian volcano Huaynaputina erupts catastrophically. This is the largest known volcanic explosion in South America and triggers severe global climatic events including the Russian famine of 1601–1603.
- William Gilbert publishes De Magnete in England, describing Earth's magnetic field; beginning of the modern science of geomagnetism.

== Exploration ==
- January – Sebald de Weert makes the first definite sighting of the Falkland Islands.
- Tadoussac, France's first trading post on the mainland of New France (now Canada), is established.

== History of science and technology ==
- Approximate date – Stradanus's engravings of notable inventions, Nova Reperta, begin publication by Philip Galle in the Netherlands.

== Mathematics ==
- approx. date – Ludolph van Ceulen computes the first 35 decimals of pi (π).

== Physics ==
- William Gilbert coins the Latin word "electricus" to describe electricity.

== Technology ==
- Simon Stevin invents a carriage propelled by sails.

== Births ==
- Early ? – Dud Dudley, English metallurgist (died 1684)
- November – John Ogilby, Scottish cartographer (died 1676)
- approx. date – Lionel Lockyer, English quack doctor (died 1672)
- approx. date – Martine Bertereau, French mineralogist

== Deaths ==
- February 15 – José de Acosta, Spanish naturalist (born 1539)
- February 17 – Giordano Bruno (born 1548), Italian, Dominican friar, philosopher, mathematician, poet, astrologer and astronomer is burned at the stake in the Campo de' Fiori by the Roman Inquisition for heresy. In the 19th and 20th centuries, he becomes regarded as a martyr for free thought and modern scientific ideas.
- September 1 – Tadeáš Hájek, Czech medical doctor and astronomer (born 1525)
