= 1598 in science =

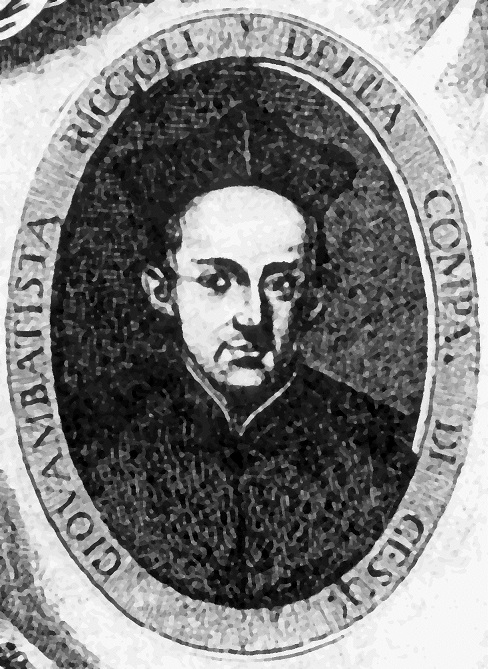
Italian Astronomer Giovanni Battista Riccioli is born

The year 1598 in science and technology involved some significant events.

== Astronomy ==
- May – Tycho Brahe's star catalogue Astronomiæ instauratæ mechanica, listing the positions of 1,004 stars, is published.

== Exploration ==
- Spanish prospectors discover the Ojuela Mine.

== Zoology ==
- Autumn – After being separated from the main Second Dutch Expedition to Indonesia fleet of Admiral Wybrand Van Warwyck, three ships under Jacob Cornelisz. van Neck land on the island which they name Mauritius and sight the dodo bird (Raphus cucullatus); it will become extinct around 1681.

== Births ==
- April 17 – Giovanni Battista Riccioli, Italian astronomer (died 1671)

== Deaths ==
- June – Emery Molyneux, English-born maker of globes and scientific instruments
- October 11 – Joachim Camerarius the Younger, German physician and botanist (born 1534)
- Roch Le Baillif, French physician (born 1540)
