= 1605 in science =

The year 1605 in science and technology involved some significant events.

== Exploration ==
- Habitation at Port-Royal established by France under Pierre Dugua, Sieur de Mons, the first European colonization of Nova Scotia in North America (at this time part of Acadia); the Gregorian calendar is adopted.

== Chemistry ==
- First recorded use of the word Chemistry ("Chymistrie") in English, in Thomas Tymme's The Practice of Chymicall and Hermeticall Physicke, translated from Joseph Duchesne.
- The phenomenon of mechanoluminescence is first discovered by Sir Francis Bacon from scratching sugar with a knife.
- Michal Sedziwój publishes the alchemical treatise A New Light of Alchemy which proposes the existence of the "food of life" within air, much later recognized as oxygen.
- Chartreuse (liqueur) is first recorded in an alchemical manuscript; it will be made by Carthusian monks, named for the great charterhouse (la grande Chartreuse).

== Births ==
- October 19 – Thomas Browne, English physician and encyclopedist (died 1682)
- Martin van den Hove, Dutch astronomer (died 1639)
- approx. date – Semyon Dezhnyov, Pomor navigator (died 1672)

== Deaths ==
- May 4 – Ulisse Aldrovandi, Bolognese naturalist (born 1522)
- December 29 – John Davis, English explorer (born 1550)
- Roger Marbeck, English royal physician (born 1536)
