= 1609 in science =

The year 1609 in science and technology involved some significant events.

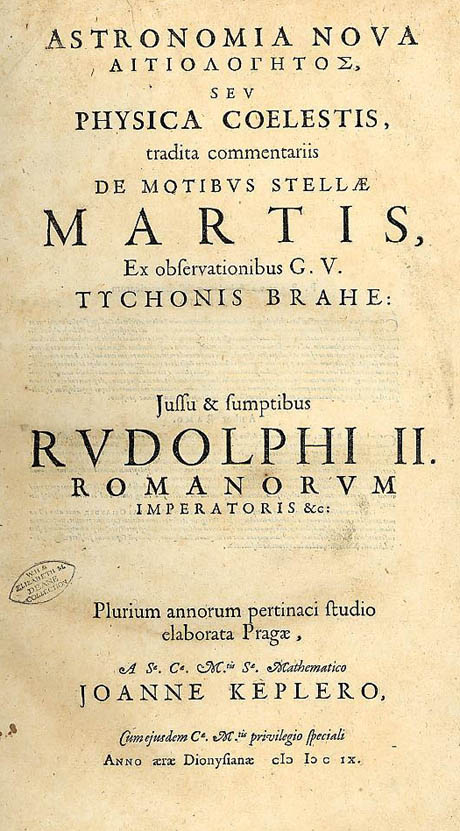
Title Page of Kepler's Astronomia nova

== Astronomy ==
- July 26 – English scientist Thomas Harriot becomes the first to draw an astronomical object after viewing it through a telescope: he draws a map of the Moon, preceding Galileo by several months.
- Johannes Kepler publishes Astronomia nova, containing his first two laws of planetary motion.

== Biology ==
- Charles Butler publishes The Feminine Monarchie, or the History of Bees, the first full-length English-language treatise on the science of beekeeping.

== Exploration ==
- April 4 – Henry Hudson sets out from Amsterdam in the Halve Maen.
  - August 28 – Hudson finds Delaware Bay.
  - September 11–12 – Hudson sails into Upper New York Bay and begins a journey up the Hudson River.

== Medicine ==
- Louise Bourgeois Boursier publishes Diverse Observations on Sterility; Loss of the Ovum after Fecundation, Fecundity and Childbirth; Diseases of Women and of Newborn Infants in Paris, the first book on obstetrics written by a woman.
- Jacques Guillemeau publishes De l'heureux accouchement des femmes in which he describes a method of assisted breech delivery.

== Technology ==
- Cornelius Drebbel invents the thermostat.

== Births ==
- June 29 – Pierre Paul Riquet, French engineer and canal builder (died 1680)
- October 8 – John Clarke, English physician (died 1676)

== Deaths ==
- March 26 – John Dee, English alchemist, astrologer and mathematician (born 1527)
- April 4 – Carolus Clusius, Flemish botanist (born 1525)
- August 4 – Joseph Duchesne, French physician and alchemist (born c.1544).
- August 16 – André du Laurens, French physician and gerontologist (born 1558).
- December – Oswald Croll, German iatrochemist (born c. 1563)
