= 1603 in science =

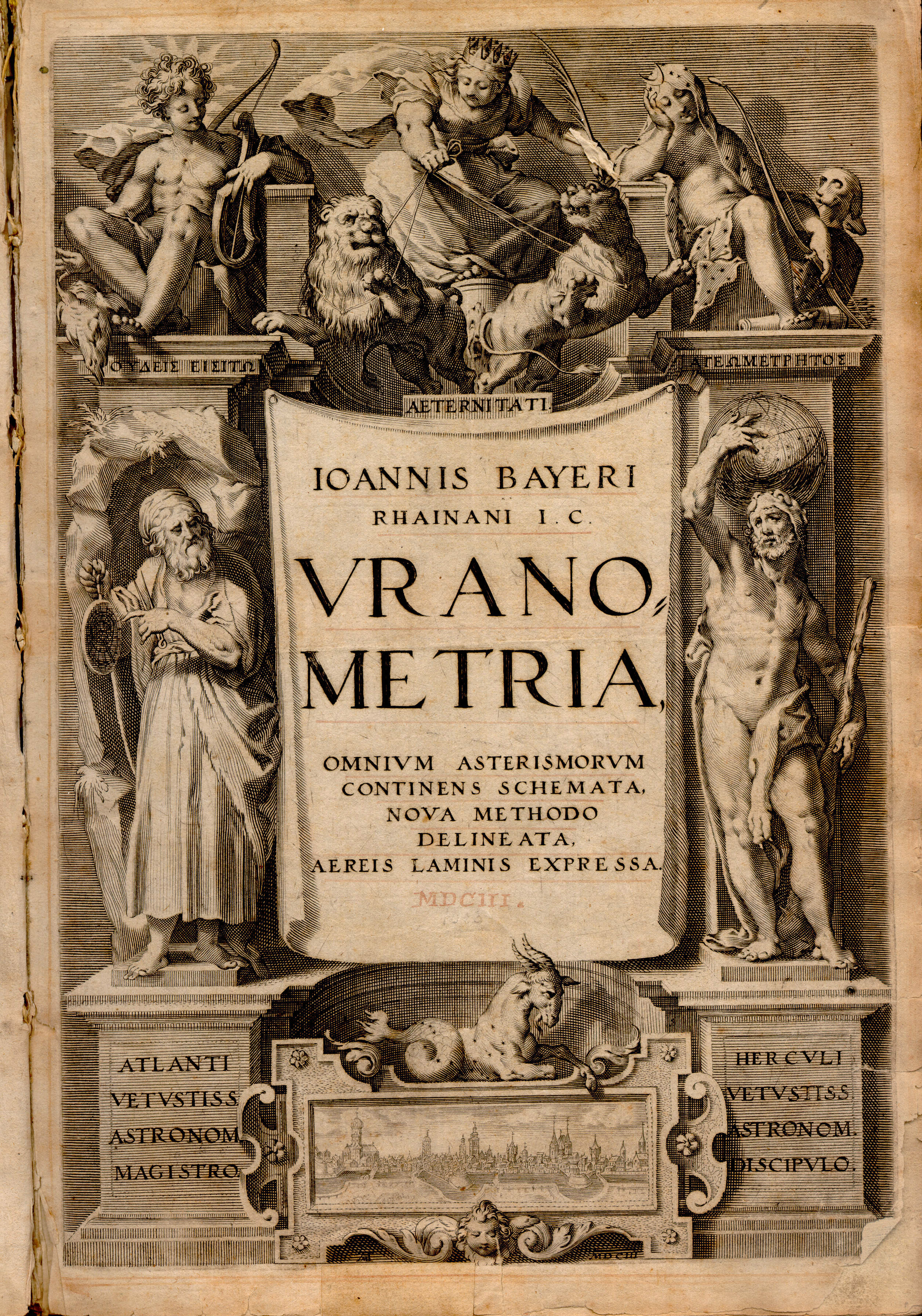

The year 1603 in science and technology involved some significant events.

== Astronomy ==
- Johann Bayer publishes the star atlas Uranometria, the first to cover the entire celestial sphere, and introducing a new system of star designation which becomes known as the Bayer designation.
- Dutch explorer Frederick de Houtman publishes his observations of the southern hemisphere constellations.

== Exploration ==
- Acadia, the French colony in North America, is founded.

== Mathematics ==
- Pietro Cataldi finds the sixth and seventh perfect numbers.

== Medicine ==
- Girolamo Fabrici studies leg veins and notices that they have valves which only allow blood to flow toward the heart.

== Institutions ==
- August 17 – Accademia dei Lincei, the oldest scientific academy in the world, is founded in Rome by Federico Cesi.

== Births ==
- September 15 – John Jonston, Polish naturalist and physician (died 1675)
- Blaise Francois Pagan, French military engineer (died 1665)
- Abel Tasman, Dutch explorer (died 1659)

== Deaths ==
- February 23 – François Viète, French mathematician (born 1540)
- Robert Alaine, English astronomer (born 1558)
