= Chemical affinity =

Property in physical chemistry

In chemical physics and physical chemistry, chemical affinity is the electronic property by which dissimilar chemical species are capable of forming chemical compounds. Chemical affinity can also refer to the tendency of an atom or compound to combine by chemical reaction with atoms or compounds of unlike composition.

== History ==
=== Early theories ===
The idea of affinity is extremely old. Many attempts have been made at identifying its origins. The majority of such attempts, however, except in a general manner, end in futility since "affinities" lie at the basis of all magic, thereby pre-dating science. Physical chemistry, however, was one of the first branches of science to study and formulate a "theory of affinity". The name affinitas was first used in the sense of chemical relation by German philosopher Albertus Magnus near the year 1250. Later, those as Robert Boyle, John Mayow, Johann Glauber, Isaac Newton, and Georg Stahl put forward ideas on elective affinity in attempts to explain how heat is evolved during combustion reactions.

The term affinity has been used figuratively since c. 1600 in discussions of structural relationships in chemistry, philology, etc., and reference to "natural attraction" is from 1616. "Chemical affinity", historically, has referred to the "force" that causes chemical reactions. as well as, more generally, and earlier, the ″tendency to combine″ of any pair of substances. The broad definition, used generally throughout history, is that chemical affinity is that whereby substances enter into or resist decomposition.

The modern term chemical affinity is a somewhat modified variation of its eighteenth-century precursor "elective affinity" or elective attractions, a term that was used by the 18th century chemistry lecturer William Cullen. Whether Cullen coined the phrase is not clear, but his usage seems to predate most others, although it rapidly became widespread across Europe, and was used in particular by the Swedish chemist Torbern Olof Bergman throughout his book De attractionibus electivis (1775). Affinity theories were used in one way or another by most chemists from around the middle of the 18th century into the 19th century to explain and organise the different combinations into which substances could enter and from which they could be retrieved. Antoine Lavoisier, in his famed 1789 Traité Élémentaire de Chimie (Elements of Chemistry), refers to Bergman's work and discusses the concept of elective affinities or attractions.

According to chemistry historian Henry Leicester, the influential 1923 textbook Thermodynamics and the Free Energy of Chemical Reactions by Gilbert N. Lewis and Merle Randall led to the replacement of the term "affinity" by the term "free energy" in much of the English-speaking world.

According to Prigogine, the term was introduced and developed by Théophile de Donder.

Johann Wolfgang von Goethe used the concept in his novel Elective Affinities (1809).

=== Visual representations ===
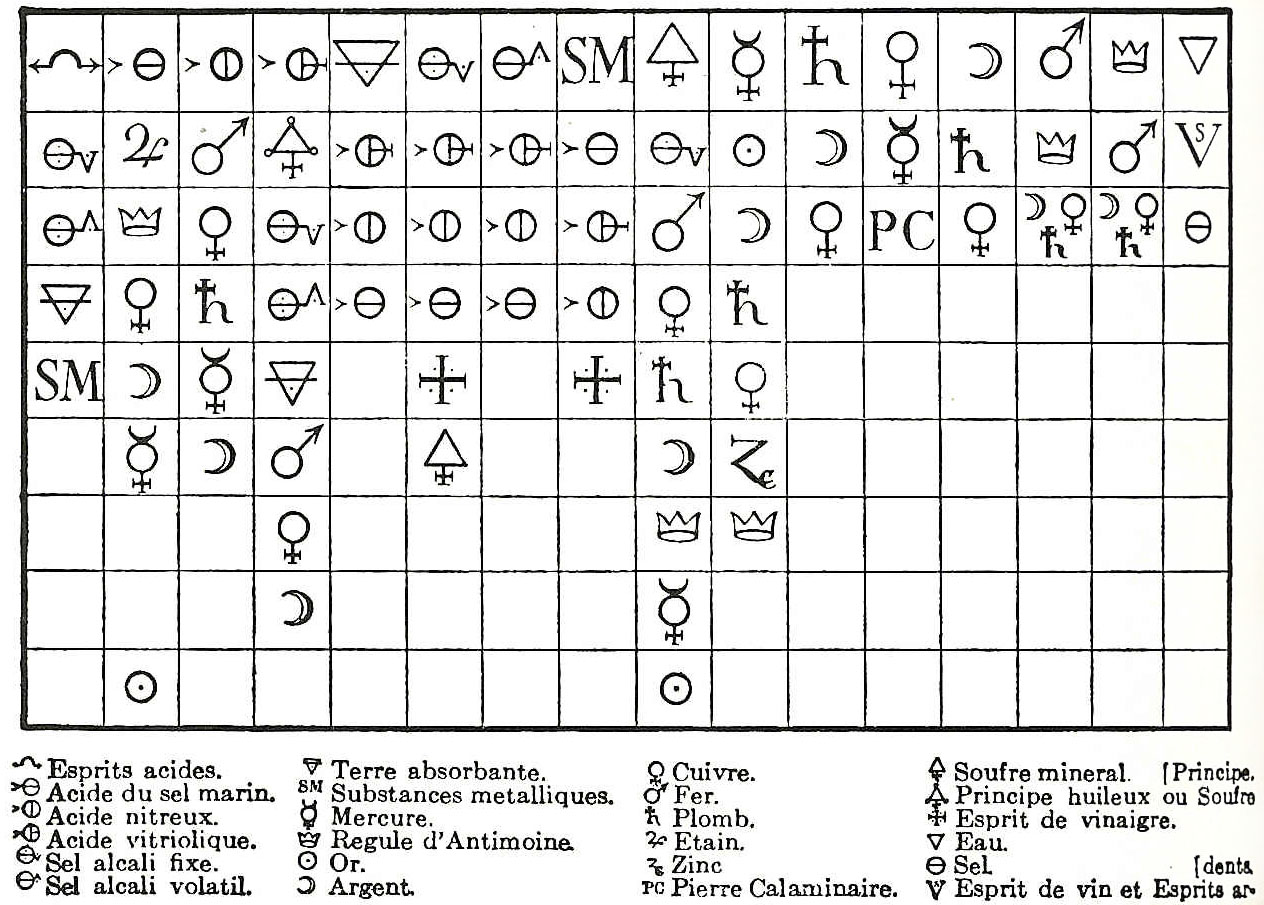
Geoffroy's Affinity Table (1718): At the head of the column is a substance with which all the substances below can combine, where each column below the header is ranked by degrees of "affinity"

The affinity concept was very closely linked to the visual representation of substances on a table. The first-ever affinity table, which was based on displacement reactions, was published in 1718 by the French chemist Étienne François Geoffroy. Geoffroy's name is best known in connection with these tables of "affinities" (tables des rapports), which were first presented to the French Academy of Sciences in 1718 and 1720.

During the 18th century many versions of the table were proposed with leading chemists like Torbern Bergman in Sweden and Joseph Black in Scotland adapting it to accommodate new chemical discoveries. All the tables were essentially lists, prepared by collating observations on the actions of substances one upon another, showing the varying degrees of affinity exhibited by analogous bodies for different reagents.

Crucially, the table was the central graphic tool used to teach chemistry to students and its visual arrangement was often combined with other kinds diagrams. Joseph Black, for example, used the table in combination with chiastic and circlet diagrams to visualise the core principles of chemical affinity. Affinity tables were used throughout Europe until the early 19th century when they were displaced by affinity concepts introduced by Claude Berthollet.

== Modern conceptions ==
In chemical physics and physical chemistry, chemical affinity is the electronic property by which dissimilar chemical species are capable of forming chemical compounds. Chemical affinity can also refer to the tendency of an atom or compound to combine by chemical reaction with atoms or compounds of unlike composition.

In modern terms, we relate affinity to the phenomenon whereby certain atoms or molecules have the tendency to aggregate or bond. For example, in the 1919 book Chemistry of Human Life physician George W. Carey states that, "Health depends on a proper amount of iron phosphate Fe_{3}(PO_{4})_{2} in the blood, for the molecules of this salt have chemical affinity for oxygen and carry it to all parts of the organism." In this antiquated context, chemical affinity is sometimes found synonymous with the term "magnetic attraction". Many writings, up until about 1925, also refer to a "law of chemical affinity".

Ilya Prigogine summarized the concept of affinity, saying, "All chemical reactions drive the system to a state of equilibrium in which the affinities of the reactions vanish."

== Thermodynamics ==
The present IUPAC definition is that affinity A is the negative partial derivative of Gibbs free energy G with respect to extent of reaction ξ at constant pressure and temperature. That is,

$$A = -\left(\frac{\partial G}{\partial \xi}\right)_{P,T}.$$

It follows that affinity is positive for spontaneous reactions.

In 1923, the Belgian mathematician and physicist Théophile de Donder derived a relation between affinity and the Gibbs free energy of a chemical reaction. Through a series of derivations, de Donder showed that if we consider a mixture of chemical species with the possibility of chemical reaction, it can be proven that the following relation holds:

$$A = -\Delta_rG. \,$$

With the writings of Théophile de Donder as precedent, Ilya Prigogine and Defay in Chemical Thermodynamics (1954) defined chemical affinity as the rate of change of the uncompensated heat of reaction Q' as the reaction progress variable or reaction extent ξ grows infinitesimally:

$$A  = \frac{{\mathrm d}Q'}{{\mathrm d}\xi}. \,$$

This definition is useful for quantifying the factors responsible both for the state of equilibrium systems (where A = 0), and for changes of state of non-equilibrium systems (where A ≠ 0).

== See also ==
- Chemistry
- Chemical bond
- Electronegativity
- Electron affinity
- Valency
- Affinity chromatography
- Affinity electrophoresis
