= Response reactions =

The theory of response reactions (RERs) was elaborated for systems in which several physico-chemical processes run simultaneously in mutual interaction, with local thermodynamic equilibrium, and in which state variables called extents of reaction are allowed, but thermodynamic equilibrium proper is not required. It is based on detailed analysis of the Hessian determinant, using either the Gibbs or the De Donder method of analysis. The theory derives the sensitivity coefficient as the sum of the contributions of individual RERs. Thus phenomena which are in contradiction to over-general statements of the Le Chatelier principle can be interpreted. With the help of RERs the equilibrium coupling was defined. RERs could be derived based either on the species, or on the stoichiometrically independent reactions of a parallel system. The set of RERs is unambiguous in a given system; and the number of them (M) is $S \choose C+1$, where S denotes the number of species and C refers to the number of components. In the case of three-component systems, RERs can be visualized on a triangle diagram.
