= Van 't Hoff equation =

Relation between temperature and the equilibrium constant of a chemical reaction

The Van 't Hoff equation relates the change in the equilibrium constant, K_{eq}, of a chemical reaction to the change in temperature, T, given the standard enthalpy change, Δ_{r}H^{⊖}, for the process. The subscript $r$ means "reaction" and the superscript $\ominus$ means "standard". It was proposed by Dutch chemist Jacobus Henricus van 't Hoff in 1884 in his book Études de Dynamique chimique (Studies in Dynamic Chemistry).

The Van 't Hoff equation has been widely utilized to explore the changes in state functions in a thermodynamic system. The Van 't Hoff plot, which is derived from this equation, is especially effective in estimating the change in enthalpy and entropy of a chemical reaction.

== Equation ==
=== Summary and uses ===
The standard pressure, $P^0$, is used to define the reference state for the Van 't Hoff equation, which is

$\frac{\mathrm{d} }{\mathrm{d} T} \ln K_\mathrm{eq} = \frac{\Delta_r H^\ominus}{RT^2}$

where ln denotes the natural logarithm, $K_\mathrm{eq}$ is the thermodynamic equilibrium constant, and R is the ideal gas constant. This equation is exact at any one temperature and all pressures, derived from the requirement that the Gibbs free energy of reaction be stationary in a state of chemical equilibrium.

In practice, the equation is often integrated between two temperatures under the assumption that the standard reaction enthalpy $\Delta_r H^\ominus$ is constant (and furthermore, this is also often assumed to be equal to its value at standard temperature). Since in reality $\Delta_r H^\ominus$ and the standard reaction entropy $\Delta_r S^\ominus$ do vary with temperature for most processes, the integrated equation is only approximate. Approximations are also made in practice to the activity coefficients within the equilibrium constant.

A major use of the integrated equation is to estimate a new equilibrium constant at a new absolute temperature assuming a constant standard enthalpy change over the temperature range. To obtain the integrated equation, it is convenient to first rewrite the Van 't Hoff equation as

$$\frac{d \ln K_\mathrm{eq}}{d \frac{1}{T}} = -\frac{\Delta_r H^\ominus}{R}.$$

The definite integral between temperatures T_{1} and T_{2} is then

$$\ln \frac{K_2}{K_1} = \frac{-\Delta_r H^\ominus}{R} \left( \frac{1}{T_2} - \frac{1}{T_1} \right).$$

In this equation K_{1} is the equilibrium constant at absolute temperature T_{1}, and K_{2} is the equilibrium constant at absolute temperature T_{2}.

=== Development from thermodynamics ===
Combining the well-known formula for the Gibbs free energy of reaction

$$\Delta_r G^\ominus = \Delta_r H^\ominus - T\Delta_r S^\ominus,$$

where S is the entropy of the system, with the Gibbs free energy isotherm equation:

$$\Delta_r G^\ominus = -RT \ln K_\mathrm{eq},$$

we obtain

$$\ln K_\mathrm{eq} = -\frac{\Delta_r H^\ominus}{RT} + \frac{\Delta_r S^\ominus}{R}.$$

Differentiation of this expression with respect to the variable T while assuming that both $\Delta_r H^\ominus$and $\Delta_r S^\ominus$ are independent of T yields the Van 't Hoff equation. These assumptions are expected to break down somewhat for large temperature variations.

Provided that $\Delta_r H^\ominus$ and $\Delta_r S^\ominus$ are constant, the preceding equation gives ln K as a linear function of 1/T and hence is known as the linear form of the Van 't Hoff equation. Therefore, when the range in temperature is small enough that the standard reaction enthalpy and reaction entropy are essentially constant, a plot of the natural logarithm of the equilibrium constant versus the reciprocal temperature gives a straight line. The slope of the line may be multiplied by the gas constant R to obtain the standard enthalpy change of the reaction, and the intercept may be multiplied by R to obtain the standard entropy change.

=== Van 't Hoff isotherm ===
The Van 't Hoff isotherm can be used to determine the temperature dependence of the Gibbs free energy of reaction for non-standard state reactions at a constant temperature:

$$\left(\frac {dG}{d\xi}\right)_{T,p} = \Delta_\mathrm{r}G = \Delta_\mathrm{r}G^\ominus + RT \ln Q_\mathrm{r},$$

where $\Delta_\mathrm{r}G$ is the Gibbs free energy of reaction under non-standard states at temperature $T$, $\Delta_r G^\ominus$ is the Gibbs free energy for the reaction at $(T,P^0)$, $\xi$ is the extent of reaction, and Q_{r} is the thermodynamic reaction quotient. Since $\Delta_r G^\ominus = - RT \ln K_{eq}$, the temperature dependence of both terms can be described by Van t'Hoff equations as a function of T. This finds applications in the field of electrochemistry. particularly in the study of the temperature dependence of voltaic cells.

The isotherm can also be used at fixed temperature to describe the Law of Mass Action. When a reaction is at equilibrium, Q_{r} = K_{eq} and $\Delta_\mathrm{r}G = 0$. Otherwise, the Van 't Hoff isotherm predicts the direction that the system must shift in order to achieve equilibrium; when Δ_{r}G < 0, the reaction moves in the forward direction, whereas when Δ_{r}G > 0, the reaction moves in the backwards direction. See Chemical equilibrium.

== Van 't Hoff plot ==
For a reversible reaction, the equilibrium constant can be measured at a variety of temperatures. This data can be plotted on a graph with ln K_{eq} on the y-axis and 1/T on the x axis. The data should have a linear relationship, the equation for which can be found by fitting the data using the linear form of the Van 't Hoff equation

$$\ln K_\mathrm{eq} = -\frac{\Delta_r H^\ominus}{RT} + \frac{\Delta_r S^\ominus}{R}.$$

This graph is called the "Van 't Hoff plot" and is widely used to estimate the enthalpy and entropy of a chemical reaction. From this plot, −Δ_{r}H/R is the slope, and Δ_{r}S/R is the intercept of the linear fit.

By measuring the equilibrium constant, K_{eq}, at different temperatures, the Van 't Hoff plot can be used to assess a reaction when temperature changes. Knowing the slope and intercept from the Van 't Hoff plot, the enthalpy and entropy of a reaction can be easily obtained using

$$\begin{align}
\Delta_r H &= - R \times \text{slope}, \\
\Delta_r S &= R \times \text{intercept}.
\end{align}$$

The Van 't Hoff plot can be used to quickly determine the enthalpy of a chemical reaction both qualitatively and quantitatively. This change in enthalpy can be positive or negative, leading to two major forms of the Van 't Hoff plot.

=== Endothermic reactions ===
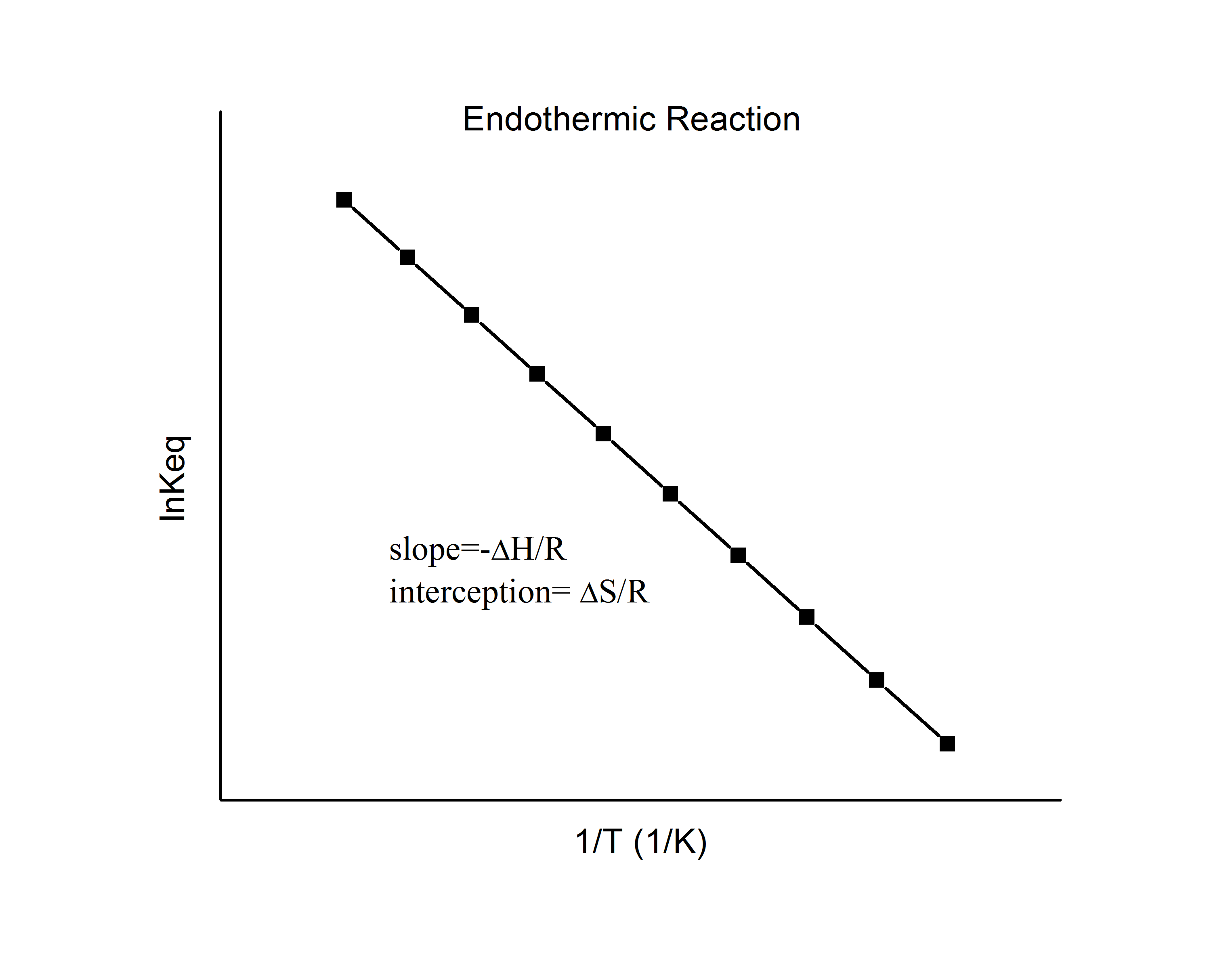
Van 't Hoff plot for an endothermic reaction

For an endothermic reaction, heat is absorbed, making the net enthalpy change positive. Thus, according to the definition of the slope:

$$\text{slope} = -\frac{\Delta_r H}{R},$$

When the reaction is endothermic, Δ_{r}H > 0 (and the gas constant R > 0), so

$$\text{slope} = -\frac{\Delta_r H}{R} < 0.$$

Thus, for an endothermic reaction, the Van 't Hoff plot should always have a negative slope.

=== Exothermic reactions ===
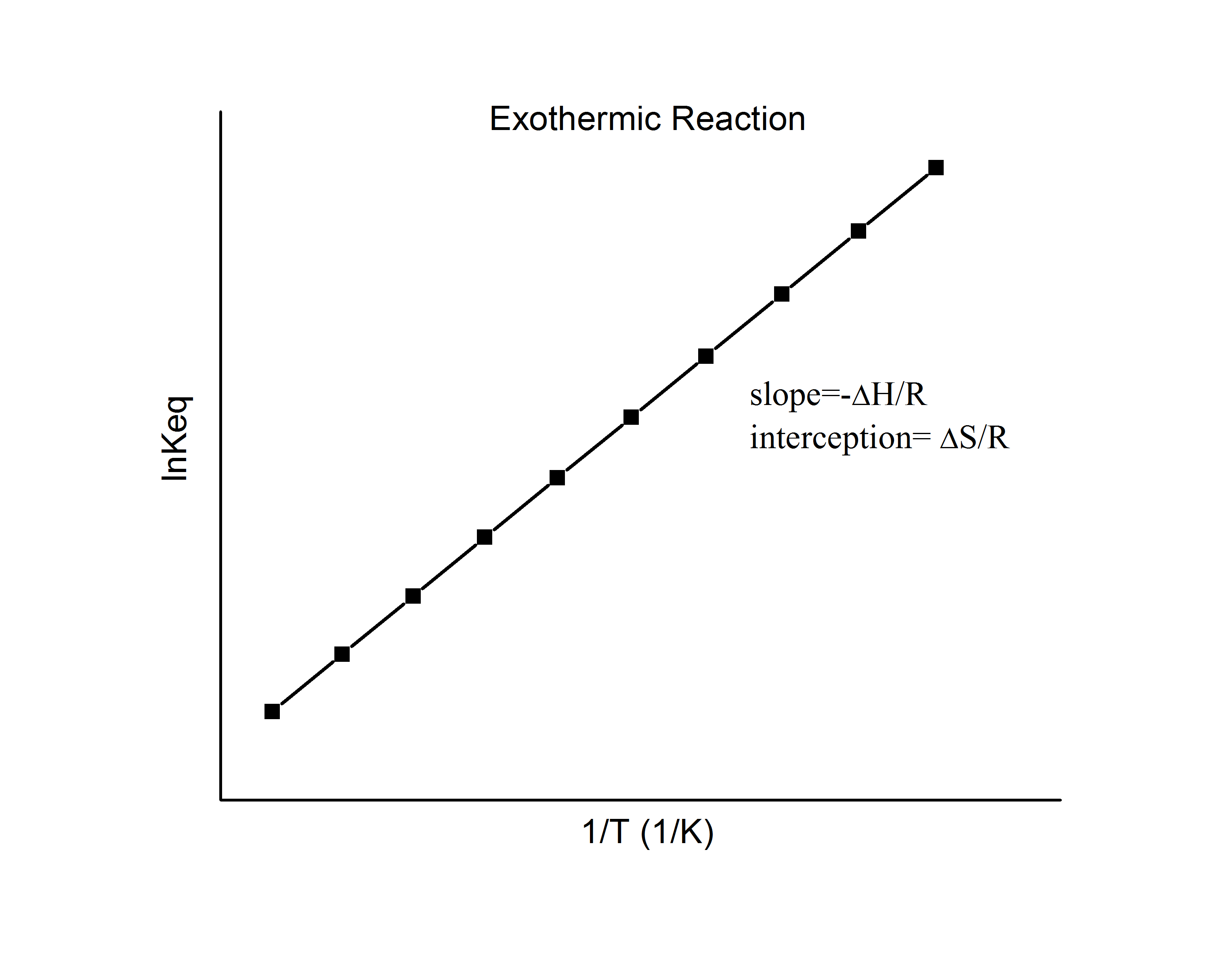
Van 't Hoff plot for an exothermic reaction

For an exothermic reaction, heat is released, making the net enthalpy change negative. Thus, according to the definition of the slope:

$$\text{slope} = -\frac{\Delta_r H}{R},$$

For an exothermic reaction Δ_{r}H < 0, so

$$\text{slope} = -\frac{\Delta_r H}{R} > 0.$$

Thus, for an exothermic reaction, the Van 't Hoff plot should always have a positive slope.

=== Error propagation ===
At first glance, using the fact that Δ_{r}G^{⊖} = −RT ln K = Δ_{r}H^{⊖} − TΔ_{r}S^{⊖} it would appear that two measurements of K would suffice to be able to obtain an accurate value of Δ_{r}H^{⊖}:

$$\Delta_r H^\ominus = R \frac{\ln K_1 - \ln K_2}{\frac{1}{T_2} - \frac{1}{T_1}},$$

where K_{1} and K_{2} are the equilibrium constant values obtained at temperatures T_{1} and T_{2} respectively. However, the precision of Δ_{r}H^{⊖} values obtained in this way is highly dependent on the precision of the measured equilibrium constant values.

The use of error propagation shows that the error in Δ_{r}H^{⊖} will be about 76 kJ/mol times the experimental uncertainty in (ln K_{1} − ln K_{2}), or about 110 kJ/mol times the uncertainty in the ln K values. Similar considerations apply to the entropy of reaction obtained from Δ_{r}S^{⊖} = 1/T(ΔH^{⊖} + RT ln K).

Notably, when equilibrium constants are measured at three or more temperatures, values of Δ_{r}H^{⊖} and Δ_{r}S^{⊖} are often obtained by straight-line fitting. The expectation is that the error will be reduced by this procedure, although the assumption that the enthalpy and entropy of reaction are constant may or may not prove to be correct. If there is significant temperature dependence in either or both quantities, it should manifest itself in nonlinear behavior in the Van 't Hoff plot; however, more than three data points would presumably be needed in order to observe this.

== Applications of the Van 't Hoff plot ==
=== Van 't Hoff analysis ===
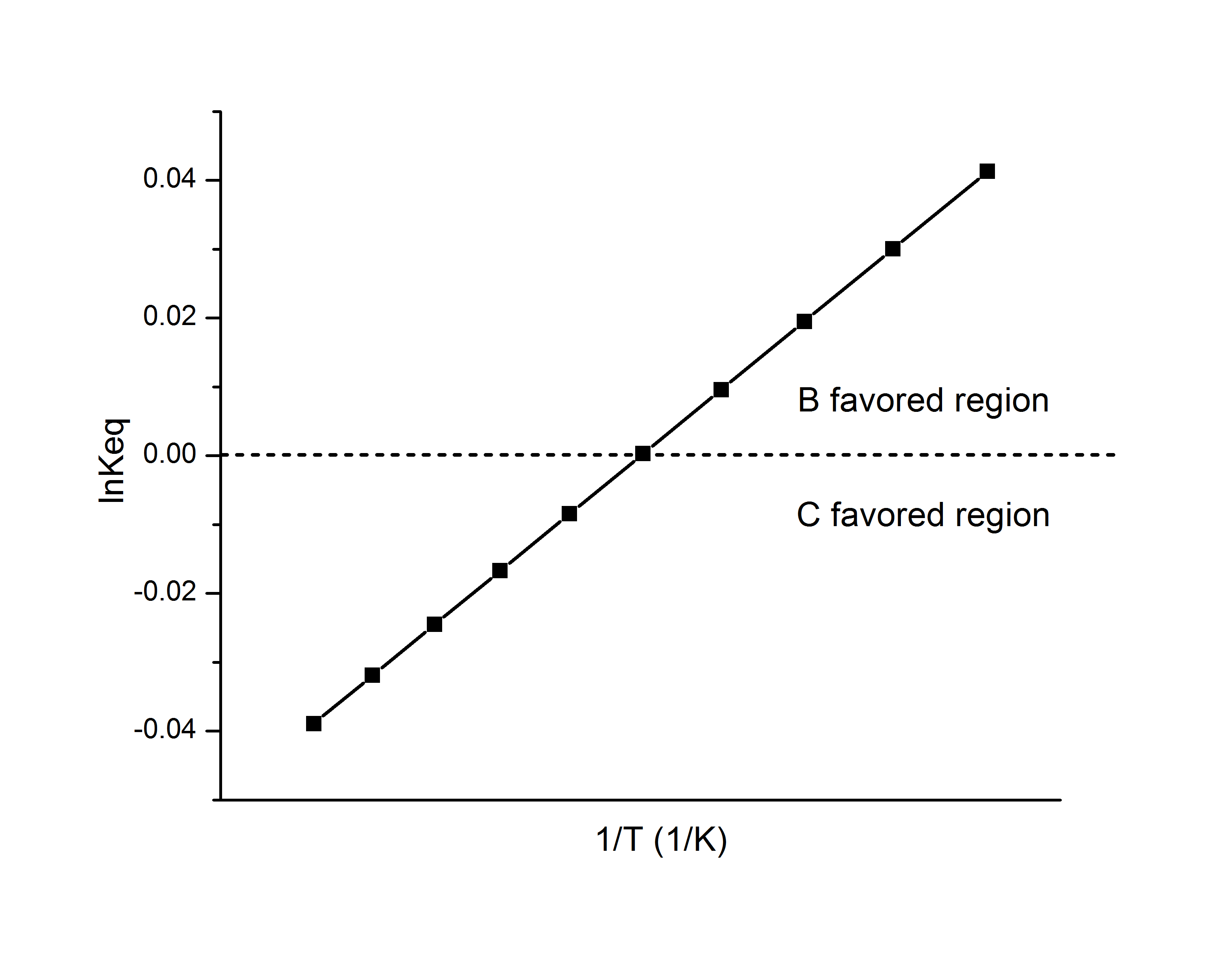
Van 't Hoff analysis

In biological research, the Van 't Hoff plot is also called Van 't Hoff analysis. It is most effective in determining the favored product in a reaction. It may obtain results different from direct calorimetry such as differential scanning calorimetry or isothermal titration calorimetry due to various effects other than experimental error.

Assume two products B and C form in a reaction:

a A + d D → b B,
a A + d D → c C.

In this case, K_{eq} can be defined as ratio of B to C rather than the equilibrium constant.

When B/C > 1, B is the favored product, and the data on the Van 't Hoff plot will be in the positive region.

When B/C < 1, C is the favored product, and the data on the Van 't Hoff plot will be in the negative region.

Using this information, a Van 't Hoff analysis can help determine the most suitable temperature for a favored product.

In 2010, a Van 't Hoff analysis was used to determine whether water preferentially forms a hydrogen bond with the C-terminus or the N-terminus of the amino acid proline. The equilibrium constant for each reaction was found at a variety of temperatures, and a Van 't Hoff plot was created. This analysis showed that enthalpically, the water preferred to hydrogen bond to the C-terminus, but entropically it was more favorable to hydrogen bond with the N-terminus. Specifically, they found that C-terminus hydrogen bonding was favored by 4.2–6.4 kJ/mol. The N-terminus hydrogen bonding was favored by 31–43 J/(K mol).

This data alone could not conclude which site water will preferentially hydrogen-bond to, so additional experiments were used. It was determined that at lower temperatures, the enthalpically favored species, the water hydrogen-bonded to the C-terminus, was preferred. At higher temperatures, the entropically favored species, the water hydrogen-bonded to the N-terminus, was preferred.

=== Mechanistic studies ===
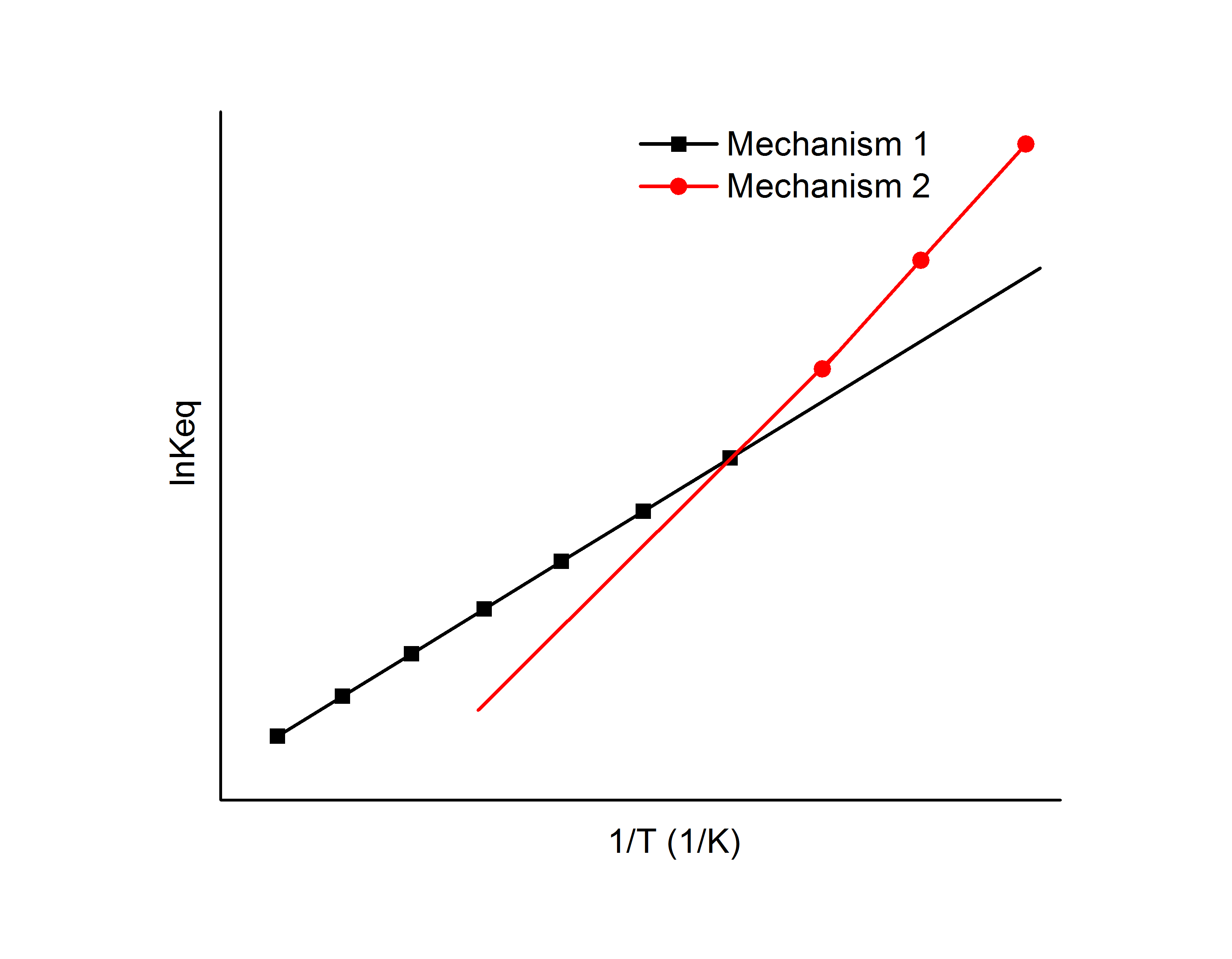
Van 't Hoff plot in mechanism study

A chemical reaction may undergo different reaction mechanisms at different temperatures.

In this case, a Van 't Hoff plot with two or more linear fits may be exploited. Each linear fit has a different slope and intercept, which indicates different changes in enthalpy and entropy for each distinct mechanisms. The Van 't Hoff plot can be used to find the enthalpy and entropy change for each mechanism and the favored mechanism under different temperatures.

$$\begin{align}
\Delta_r H_1 &= - R \times \text{slope}_1, &
\Delta_r S_1 &= R \times \text{intercept}_1; \\[5pt]
\Delta_r H_2 &= - R \times \text{slope}_2, &
\Delta_r S_2 &= R \times \text{intercept}_2.
\end{align}$$

In the example figure, the reaction undergoes mechanism 1 at high temperature and mechanism 2 at low temperature.

=== Temperature dependence ===
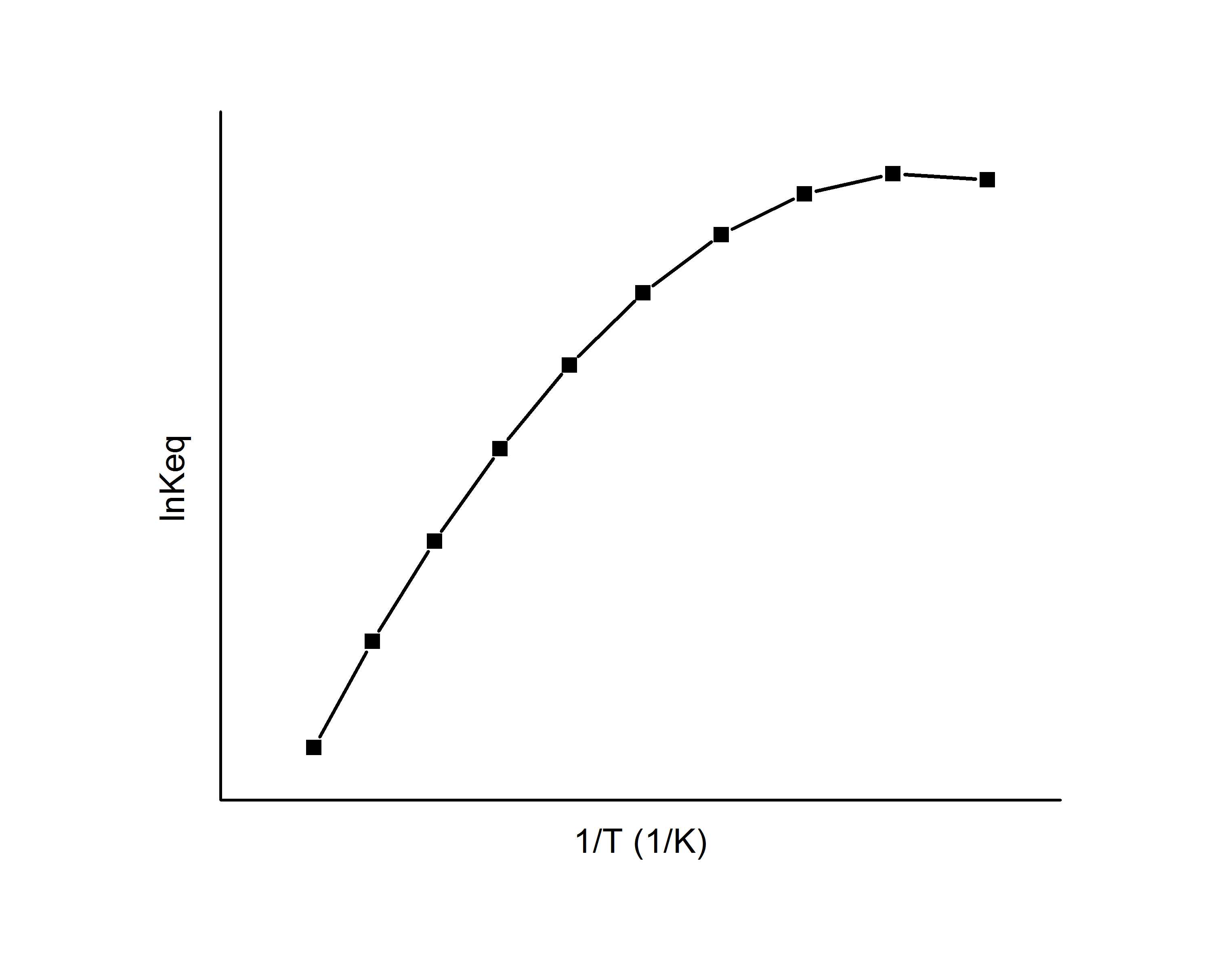
Temperature-dependent Van 't Hoff plot

If the enthalpy and entropy are roughly constant as temperature varies over a certain range, then the Van 't Hoff plot is approximately linear when plotted over that range. However, in some cases the enthalpy and entropy do change dramatically with temperature. A first-order approximation is to assume that the two different reaction products have different heat capacities. Incorporating this assumption yields an additional term c/T^{2} in the expression for the equilibrium constant as a function of temperature. A polynomial fit can then be used to analyze data that exhibits a non-constant standard enthalpy of reaction:

$$\ln K_\mathrm{eq} = a + \frac {b}{T} + \frac {c}{T^2} ,$$

where

$$\begin{align}
\Delta_r H &= -R \left(b + \frac{2c}{T}\right),\\
\Delta_r S &= R \left(a - \frac{c}{T^2}\right).
\end{align}$$

Thus, the enthalpy and entropy of a reaction can still be determined at specific temperatures even when a temperature dependence exists.

=== Surfactant self-assembly ===
The Van 't Hoff relation is particularly useful for the determination of the micellization enthalpy ΔH^{⊖}_{m} of surfactants from the temperature dependence of the critical micelle concentration (CMC):

$$\frac{d}{dT} \ln \mathrm{CMC} = \frac{\Delta H^\ominus_\mathrm{m}}{RT^2} .$$

However, the relation loses its validity when the aggregation number is also temperature-dependent, and the following relation should be used instead:

$$RT^2\left(\frac{\partial}{\partial T}\ln\mathrm{CMC}\right)_P = -\Delta_r H^\ominus_\mathrm{m}(N) + T\left(\frac{\partial}{\partial N}\left(G_{N+1} - G_N\right)\right)_{T,P}\left(\frac{\partial N}{\partial T}\right)_P,$$

with G_{N + 1} and G_{N} being the free energies of the surfactant in a micelle with aggregation number N + 1 and N respectively. This effect is particularly relevant for nonionic ethoxylated surfactants or polyoxypropylene–polyoxyethylene block copolymers (Poloxamers, Pluronics, Synperonics). The extended equation can be exploited for the extraction of aggregation numbers of self-assembled micelles from differential scanning calorimetric thermograms.

== See also ==
- Clausius–Clapeyron relation
- Van 't Hoff factor (i)
- Gibbs–Helmholtz equation
- Solubility equilibrium
- Arrhenius equation
