= Reversible reaction =

Chemical reaction whose products can react together to produce the reactants again

A reversible reaction is a reaction in which the conversion of reactants to products and the conversion of products to reactants occur simultaneously.

$$\ce{\mathit a\;A{} + \mathit b\;B <=> \mathit c\;C{} + \mathit d\;D}$$

A and B can react to form C and D or, in the reverse reaction, C and D can react to form A and B. This is distinct from a reversible process in thermodynamics.

Weak acids and bases undergo reversible reactions. For example, carbonic acid:

H_{2}CO_{3}(aq) + H_{2}O(l) ⇌ HCO^{−}_{3}(aq) + H_{3}O^{+}(aq)

The concentrations of reactants and products in an equilibrium mixture are determined by the analytical concentrations of the reagents (A and B or C and D) and the equilibrium constant, K. The magnitude of the equilibrium constant depends on the Gibbs free energy change for the reaction. So, when the free energy change is large (more than about 30 kJ·mol^{−1}), the equilibrium constant is large (log K > 3) and the concentrations of the reactants at equilibrium are very small. Such a reaction is sometimes considered to be an irreversible reaction, although small amounts of the reactants are still expected to be present in the reacting system. A truly irreversible chemical reaction is usually achieved when one of the products exits the reacting system, for example, as does carbon dioxide (volatile) in the reaction

CaCO_{3} + 2 HCl → CaCl_{2} + H_{2}O + CO_{2}↑

== History ==
The concept of a reversible reaction was introduced by Claude Louis Berthollet in 1803, after he had observed the formation of sodium carbonate crystals at the edge of a salt lake (one of the natron lakes in Egypt, in limestone):

2 NaCl + CaCO_{3} → Na_{2}CO_{3} + CaCl_{2}

He recognized this as the reverse of the familiar reaction

Na_{2}CO_{3} + CaCl_{2} → 2 NaCl + CaCO_{3}

Until then, chemical reactions were thought to always proceed in one direction. Berthollet reasoned that the excess of salt in the lake helped push the "reverse" reaction towards the formation of sodium carbonate.

In 1864, Peter Waage and Cato Maximilian Guldberg formulated their law of mass action which quantified Berthollet's observation. Between 1884 and 1888, Le Chatelier and Braun formulated Le Chatelier's principle, which extended the same idea to a more general statement on the effects of factors other than concentration on the position of the equilibrium.

== Reaction kinetics ==
For the reversible reaction A⇌B, the forward step A→B has a rate constant $k_1$ and the backwards step B→A has a rate constant $k_{-1}$. The concentration of A obeys the following differential equation:

$\frac{d[\mathrm{A}]}{dt}=-k_\text{1}[\mathrm{A}]+k_\text{-1}[\mathrm{B}]$.	1

If we consider that the concentration of product B at anytime is equal to the concentration of reactants at time zero minus the concentration of reactants at time $t$, we can set up the following equation:

$[\mathrm{B}]=[\mathrm{A}]_\text{0}-[\mathrm{A}]$.	2

Combining 1 and 2, we can write

$$\frac{d[\mathrm{A}]}{dt}=-k_\text{1}[\mathrm{A}]+k_\text{-1}([\mathrm{A}]_\text{0}-[\mathrm{A}])$$.

Separation of variables is possible and using an initial value $[\mathrm{A}](t=0) = [\mathrm{A}]_0$, we obtain:

$$C=\frac{{-\ln}(-k_\text{1}[\mathrm{A}]_\text{0})}{k_\text{1}+k_\text{-1}}$$

and after some algebra we arrive at the final kinetic expression:

$$[\mathrm{A}]=\frac{k_\text{-1}[\mathrm{A}]_\text{0}}{k_\text{1}+k_\text{-1}}+\frac{k_\text{1}[\mathrm{A}]_\text{0}}{k_\text{1}+k_\text{-1}}\exp{{(-k_\text{1}-k_\text{-1}})t}$$.

The concentration of A and B at infinite time has a behavior as follows:

$$[\mathrm{A}]_\infty=\frac{k_\text{-1}[\mathrm{A}]_\text{0}}{k_\text{1}+k_\text{-1}}$$

$$[\mathrm{B}]_\infty=[\mathrm{A}]_\text{0}-[\mathrm{A}]_\infty=[\mathrm{A}]_\text{0}-\frac{k_\text{-1}[\mathrm{A}]_\text{0}}{k_\text{1} +k_\text{-1}}$$

$$\frac{[\mathrm{B}]_\infty}{[\mathrm{A}]_\infty}=\frac{k_\text{1}}{k_\text{-1}}=K_\text{eq}$$

$$[\mathrm{A}]=[\mathrm{A}]_\infty+([\mathrm{A}]_\text{0}-[\mathrm{A}]_\infty)\exp(-k_\text{1}+k_\text{-1})t$$

Thus, the formula can be linearized in order to determine $k_1+k_{-1}$:

$$\ln([\mathrm{A}]-[\mathrm{A}]_\infty)=\ln([\mathrm{A}]_\text{0}-[\mathrm{A}]_\infty)-(k_\text{1}+k_\text{-1})t$$

To find the individual constants $k_1$ and $k_{-1}$, the following formula is required:

$$K_\text{eq}=\frac{k_\text{1}}{k_\text{-1}}=\frac{[\mathrm{B}]_\infty}{[\mathrm{A}]_\infty}$$

== See also ==
- Dynamic equilibrium
- Chemical equilibrium
- Irreversibility
- Microscopic reversibility
- Static equilibrium
