= Théophile De Donder =

Belgian physicist, mathematician, and chemist (1872–1957)

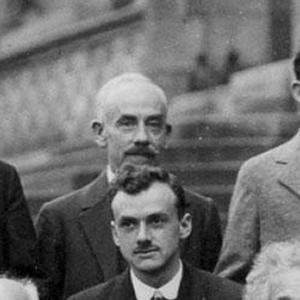
- De Donder at the 1927 Solvay Conference. Appearing in front of De Donder is Paul Dirac.
- Born: Théophile Ernest De Donder; 19 August 1872; Brussels, Belgium
- Died: 11 May 1957 (aged 84); Brussels, Belgium
- Education: Université Libre de Bruxelles
- Known for: Being the father of irreversible thermodynamics Chemical affinity Extent of reaction De Donder gauge De Donder method of analysis De Donder–Weyl theory
- Awards: ICM Speaker (1920)
- Scientific career
- Fields: Statistical physics
- Workplaces: Université Libre de Bruxelles
- Academic advisors: Henri Poincaré
- Doctoral students: Ilya Prigogine; Léon Van Hove; Théophile Lepage

Théophile Ernest De Donder (Note: The uppercase particle De is used in Belgium, in French publications his name is sometimes written as de Donder) (French: [də dɔ̃dɛʁ]; 19 August 1872 – 11 May 1957) was a Belgian mathematician, physicist and chemist known for his work (published in 1923) in developing correlations between the Newtonian concept of chemical affinity and the Gibbsian concept of free energy.

== Education ==
He received his doctorate in physics and mathematics from the Université Libre de Bruxelles in 1899, for a thesis entitled Sur la Théorie des Invariants Intégraux (On the Theory of Integral Invariants).

== Career ==
He was professor between 1911 and 1942, at the Université Libre de Bruxelles. Initially he continued the work of Henri Poincaré and Élie Cartan. From 1914 on, he was influenced by the work of Albert Einstein and was an enthusiastic proponent of the theory of relativity. He gained significant reputation in 1923, when he developed his definition of chemical affinity. He pointed out a connection between the chemical affinity and the Gibbs free energy.

He is considered the father of thermodynamics of irreversible processes. De Donder's work was later developed further by his doctoral student Ilya Prigogine. De Donder was an associate and friend of Albert Einstein. He was in 1927, one of the participants of the fifth Solvay Conference on Physics, that took place at the International Solvay Institute for Physics in Belgium. Additionally, De Donder attended the Solvay Conferences of 1924, 1930, and 1948.

== Books ==
- Thermodynamic Theory of Affinity: A Book of Principles. Oxford, England: Oxford University Press (1936)
- The Mathematical Theory of Relativity. Cambridge, MA: MIT (1927)
- Sur la théorie des invariants intégraux (thesis) (1899).
- Théorie du champ électromagnétique de Maxwell-Lorentz et du champ gravifique d'Einstein (1917)
- La gravifique Einsteinienne (1921)
- Introduction à la gravifique einsteinienne (1925)
- Théorie mathématique de l'électricité (1925)
- Théorie des champs gravifiques (1926)
- Application de la gravifique einsteinienne (1930)
- Théorie invariantive du calcul des variations (1931)

== See also ==
- Klein–Gordon equation
- Schrödinger equation
