= Timeline of chemistry =

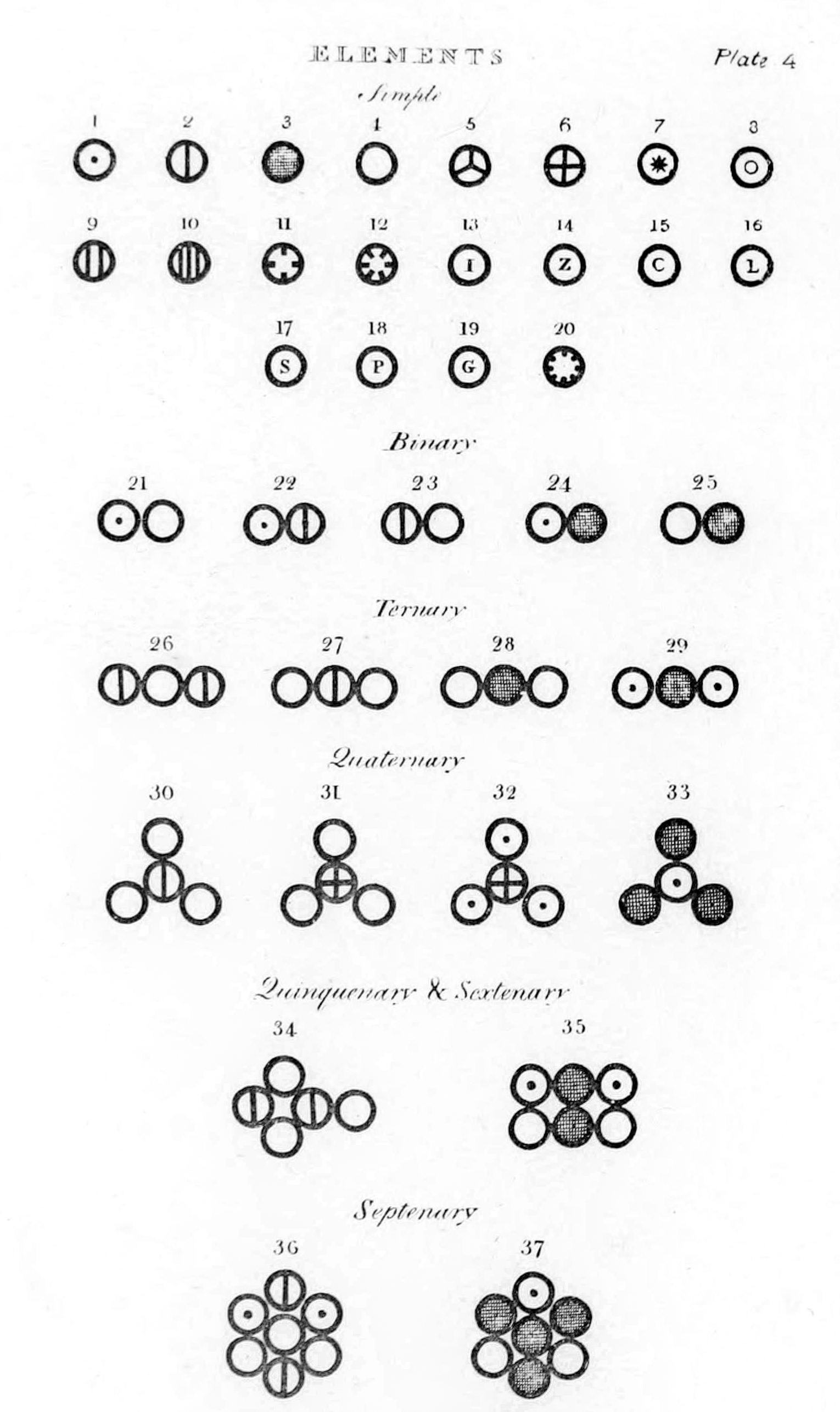
An image from John Dalton's A New System of Chemical Philosophy, the first modern explanation of atomic theory.

This timeline of chemistry lists important works, discoveries, ideas, inventions, and experiments that significantly changed humanity's understanding of the modern science known as chemistry, defined as the scientific study of the composition of matter and of its interactions.

Known as "the central science", the study of chemistry is strongly influenced by, and exerts a strong influence on, many other scientific and technological fields. Many historical developments that are considered to have had a significant impact upon our modern understanding of chemistry are also considered to have been key discoveries in such fields as physics, biology, astronomy, geology, and materials science.

== Pre-17th century ==
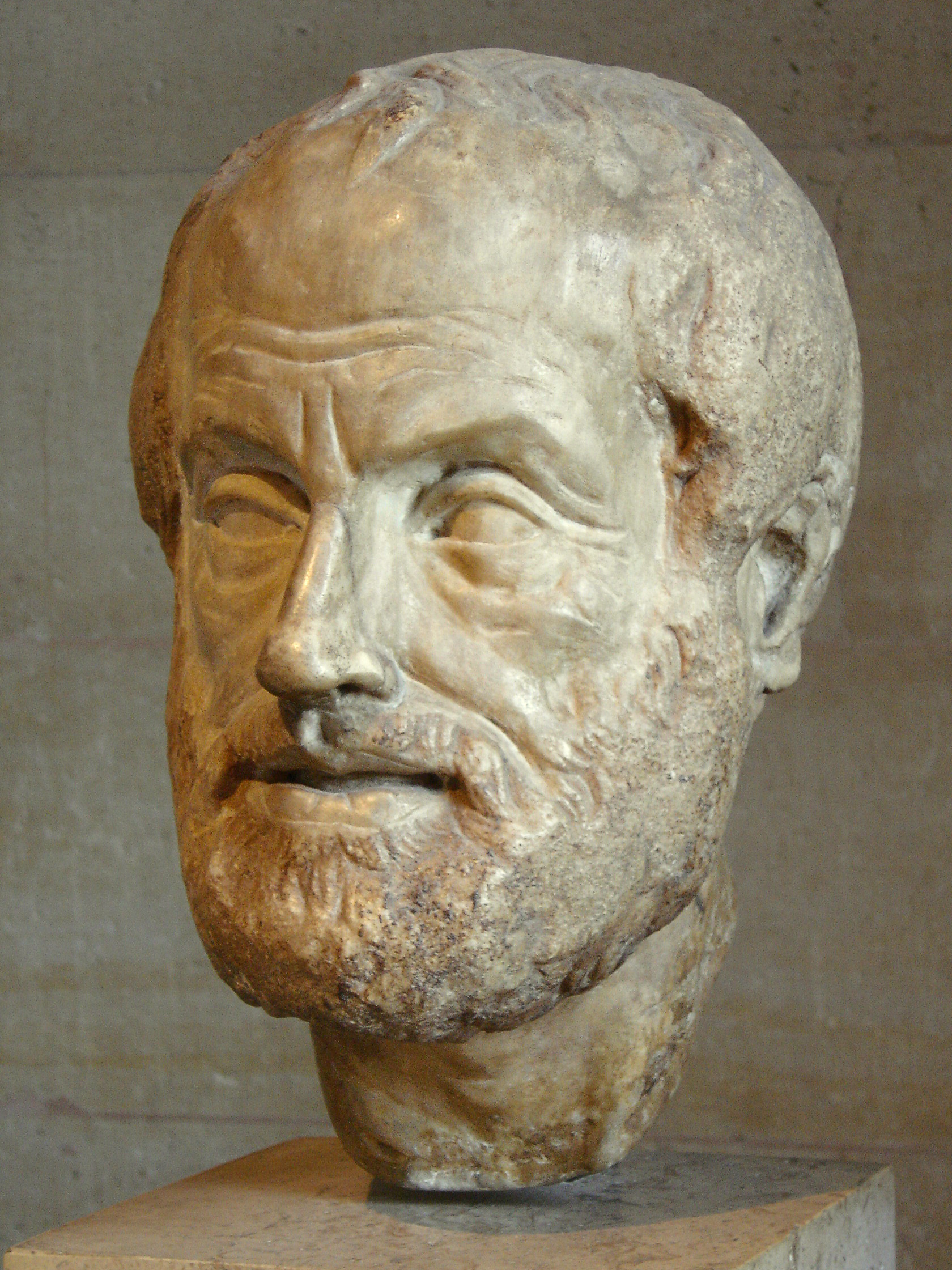
Aristotle (384–322 BCE)

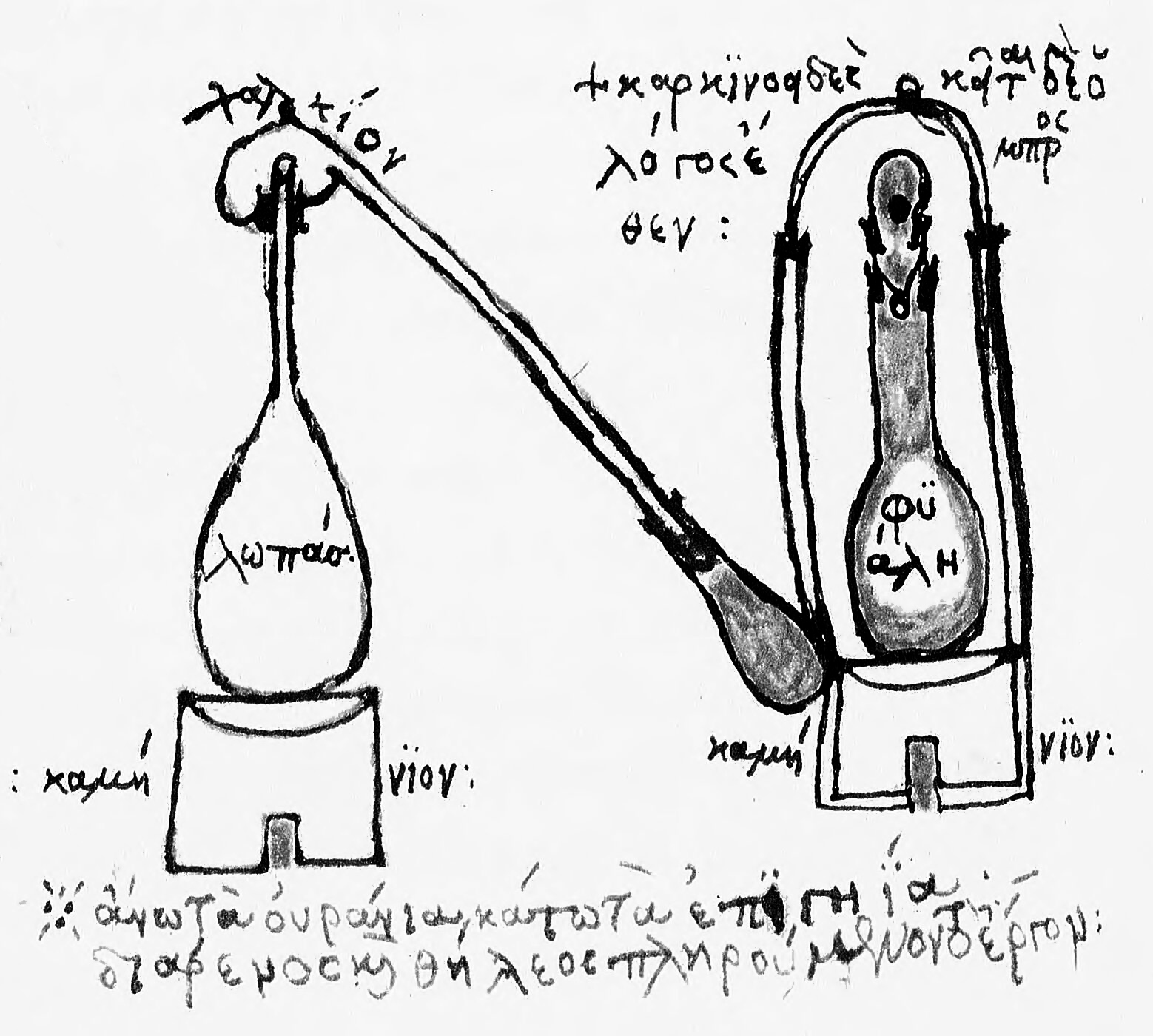
Ambix, cucurbit and retort, the alchemical implements of Zosimus c. 300 (man. Paris, Grec 2327).

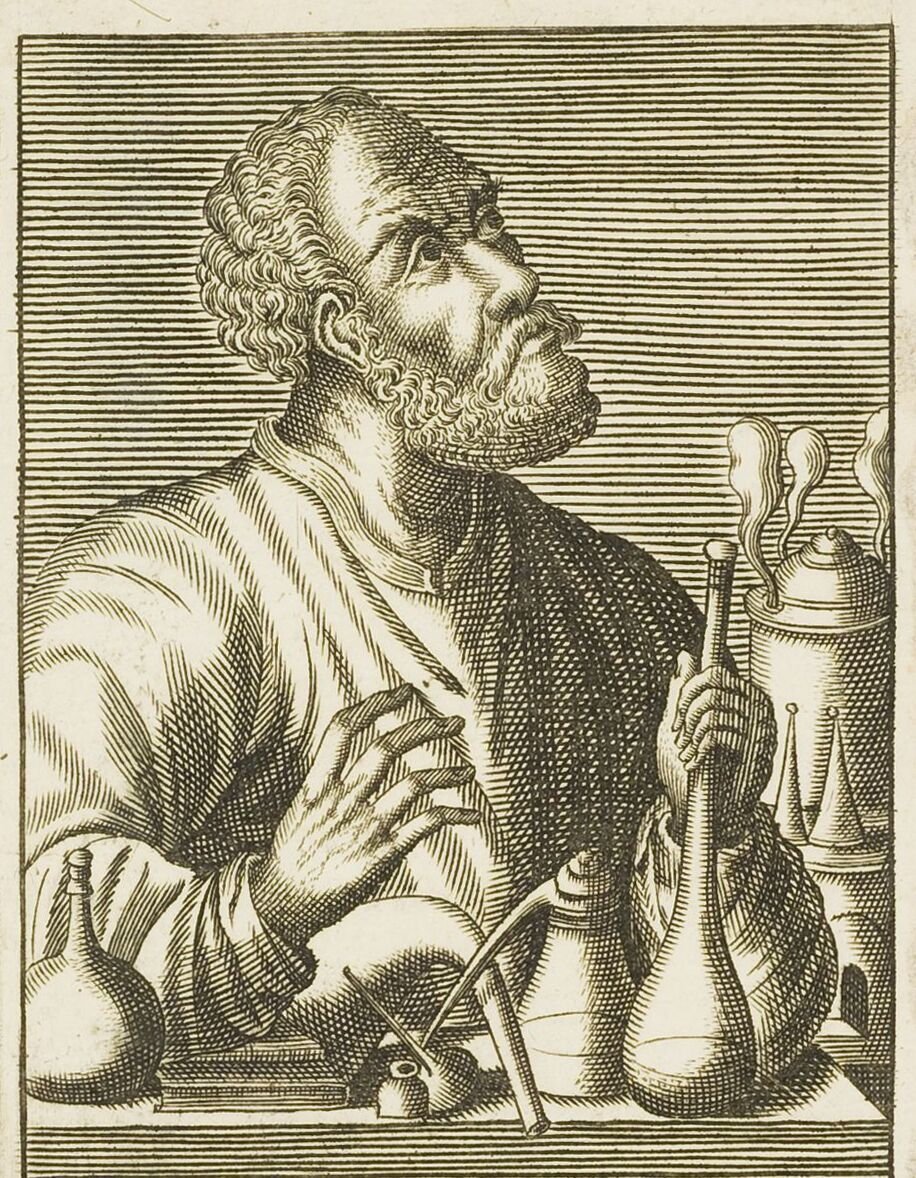
Imaginative depiction of Jābir ibn Ḥayyān (Latin: Geber)

Prior to the acceptance of the scientific method and its application to the field of chemistry, it is somewhat controversial to consider many of the people listed below as "chemists" in the modern sense of the word. However, the ideas of certain great thinkers, either for their prescience, or for their wide and long-term acceptance, bear listing here.

=== c. 1200 BC ===
Tappūtī-Bēlet-Ekallim is one of the earliest recorded chemists. She was a perfumer in Assur during the reign of Tukulti-Ninurta I, and was mentioned on a cuneiform tablet.

=== c. 450 BC ===
Empedocles asserts that all things are composed of four primal roots (later to be renamed stoicheia or elements): earth, air, fire, and water, whereby two active and opposing cosmic forces, love and strife, act upon these elements, combining and separating them into infinitely varied forms.

=== c. 440 BC ===
Leucippus and Democritus propose the idea of the atom, an indivisible particle that all matter is made of. This idea is largely rejected by natural philosophers in favor of the Aristotelian view (see below).

=== c. 360 BC ===
Plato coins term ‘elements’ (stoicheia) and in his dialogue Timaeus, which includes a discussion of the composition of inorganic and organic bodies and is a rudimentary treatise on chemistry, assumes that the minute particle of each element had a special geometric shape: tetrahedron (fire), octahedron (air), icosahedron (water), and cube (earth).

=== c. 350 BC ===
Aristotle, expanding on Empedocles, proposes idea of a substance as a combination of matter and form. Describes theory of the Five Elements, fire, water, earth, air, and aether. This theory is largely accepted throughout the western world for over 1000 years.

=== c. 50 BC ===
Lucretius publishes De Rerum Natura, a poetic description of the ideas of atomism.

=== c. 300 ===
Zosimos of Panopolis writes some of the oldest known books on alchemy, which he defines as the study of the composition of waters, movement, growth, embodying and disembodying, drawing the spirits from bodies and bonding the spirits within bodies.

=== c. 800 ===
The Secret of Creation (Arabic: Sirr al-khalīqa), an anonymous encyclopedic work on natural philosophy falsely attributed to Apollonius of Tyana, records the earliest known version of the long-held theory that all metals are composed of various proportions of sulfur and mercury. This same work also contains the earliest known version of the Emerald Tablet, a compact and cryptic Hermetic text which was still commented upon by Isaac Newton.

=== c. 850–900 ===
Arabic works attributed to Jābir ibn Ḥayyān (Latin: Geber) introduce a systematic classification of chemical substances, and provide instructions for deriving an inorganic compound (sal ammoniac or ammonium chloride) from organic substances (such as plants, blood, and hair) by chemical means.

=== c. 900 ===
Abū Bakr al-Rāzī (Latin: Rhazes), a Persian alchemist, conducts experiments with the distillation of sal ammoniac (ammonium chloride), vitriols (hydrated sulfates of various metals), and other salts, representing the first step in a long process that would eventually lead to the thirteenth-century discovery of the mineral acids.

=== c. 1000 ===
Abū al-Rayhān al-Bīrūnī and Avicenna, both Persian philosophers, deny the possibility of the transmutation of metals.

=== c. 1100–1200 ===
Recipes for the production of aqua ardens ("burning water", i.e., ethanol) by distilling wine with common salt start to appear in a number of Latin alchemical works.

=== c. 1220 ===
Robert Grosseteste publishes several Aristotelian commentaries where he lays out an early framework for the scientific method.

=== c. 1250 ===
The works of Taddeo Alderotti (1223–1296) describe a method for concentrating ethanol involving repeated fractional distillation through a water-cooled still, by which an ethanol purity of 90% could be obtained.

=== c. 1260 ===
St Albertus Magnus discovers arsenic and silver nitrate. He also made one of the first references to sulfuric acid.

=== c. 1267 ===
Roger Bacon publishes Opus Maius, which among other things, proposes an early form of the scientific method, and contains results of his experiments with gunpowder.

=== c. 1310 ===
Pseudo-Geber, an anonymous alchemist who wrote under the name of Geber (i.e., Jābir ibn Hayyān, see above), publishes the Summa perfectionis magisterii. This work contains experimental demonstrations of the corpuscular nature of matter that would still be used by seventeenth-century chemists such as Daniel Sennert. Pseudo-Geber is one of the first alchemists to describe mineral acids such as aqua fortis or 'strong water' (nitric acid, capable of dissolving silver) and aqua regia or 'royal water' (a mixture of nitric acid and hydrochloric acid, capable of dissolving gold and platinum).

=== c. 1530 ===
Paracelsus develops the study of iatrochemistry, a subdiscipline of alchemy dedicated to extending life, thus being the roots of the modern pharmaceutical industry. It is also claimed that he is the first to use the word "chemistry".

=== 1597 ===
Andreas Libavius publishes Alchemia, a prototype chemistry textbook.

== 17th and 18th centuries ==
=== 1605 ===
Sir Francis Bacon publishes The Proficience and Advancement of Learning, which contains a description of what would later be known as the scientific method.

=== 1605 ===
Michal Sedziwój publishes the alchemical treatise A New Light of Alchemy which proposed the existence of the "food of life" within air, much later recognized as oxygen.

=== 1615 ===
Jean Beguin publishes the Tyrocinium Chymicum, an early chemistry textbook, and in it draws the first-ever chemical equation.

=== 1637 ===
René Descartes publishes Discours de la méthode, which contains an outline of the scientific method.

=== 1648 ===
Posthumous publication of the book Ortus medicinae by Jan Baptist van Helmont, which is cited by some as a major transitional work between alchemy and chemistry, and as an important influence on Robert Boyle. The book contains the results of numerous experiments and establishes an early version of the law of conservation of mass.

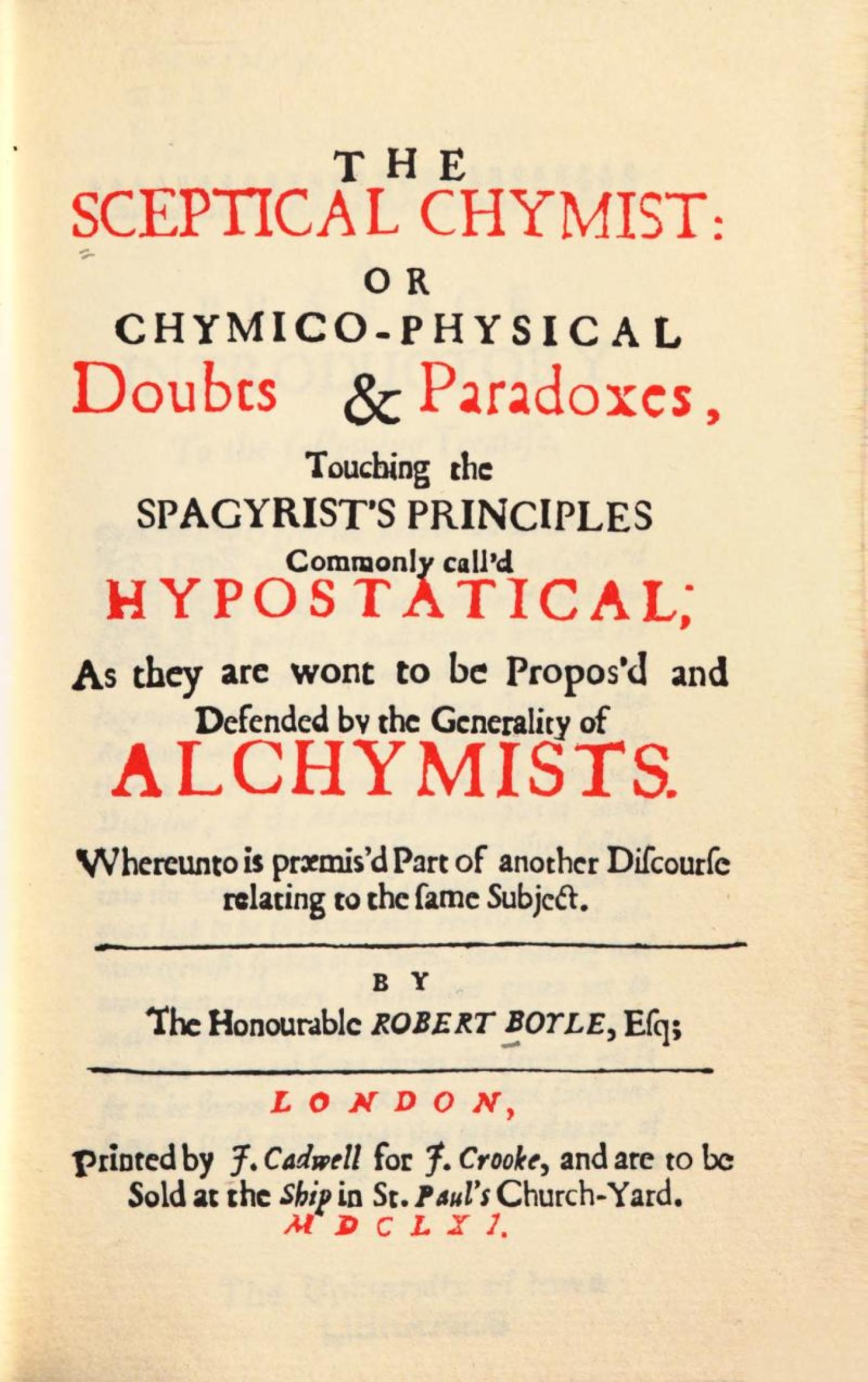
Title page of The Sceptical Chymist by Robert Boyle (1627–91)

=== 1661 ===
Robert Boyle publishes The Sceptical Chymist, a treatise on the distinction between chemistry and alchemy. It contains some of the earliest modern ideas of atoms, molecules, and chemical reaction, and marks the beginning of the history of modern chemistry.

=== 1662 ===
Robert Boyle proposes Boyle's law, an experimentally based description of the behavior of gases, specifically the relationship between pressure and volume.

=== 1735 ===
Swedish chemist Georg Brandt analyzes a dark blue pigment found in copper ore. Brandt demonstrated that the pigment contained a new element, later named cobalt.

=== 1754 ===
Joseph Black isolates carbon dioxide, which he called "fixed air".

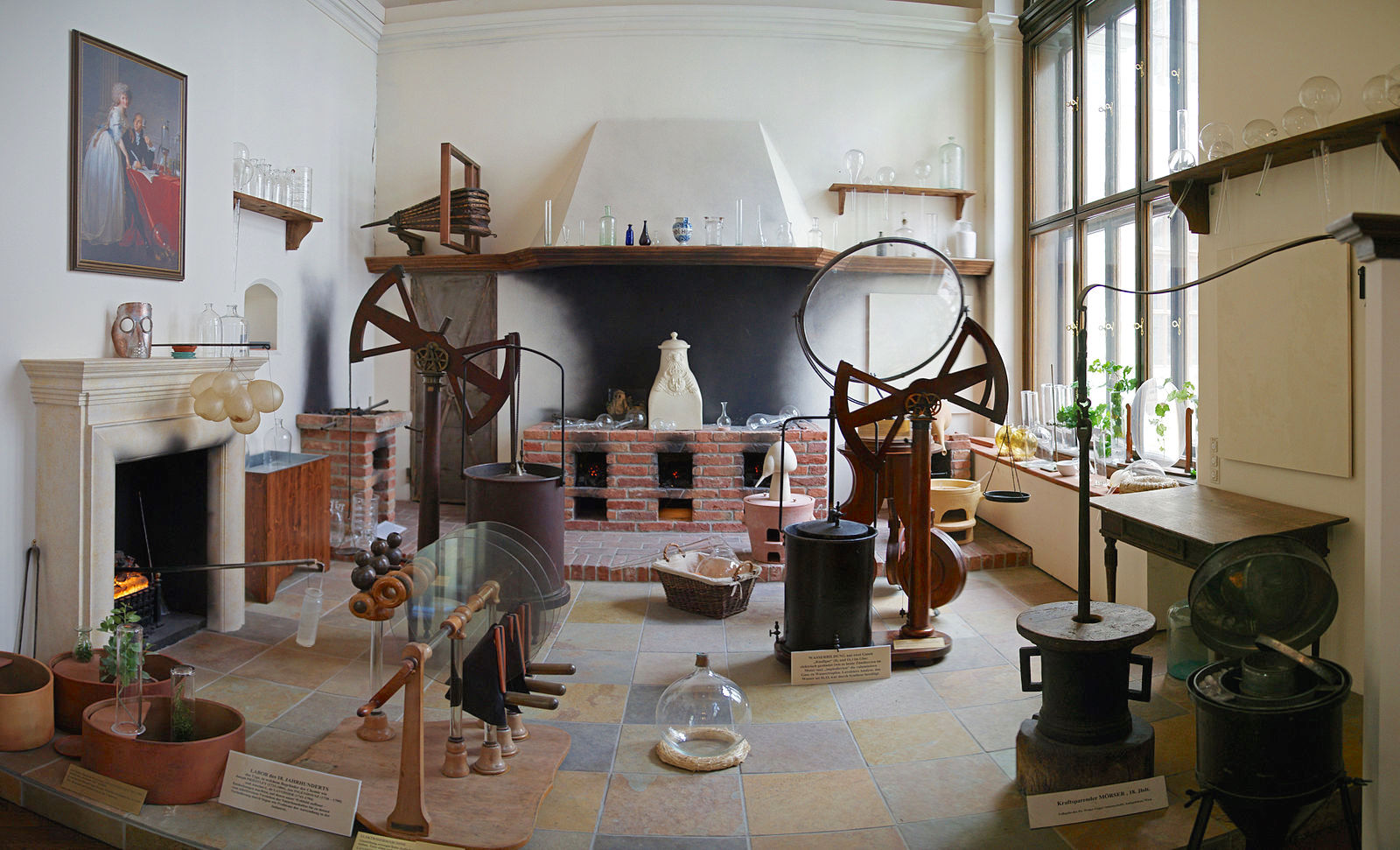
A typical chemical laboratory of the 18th century

=== 1757 ===
Louis Claude Cadet de Gassicourt, while investigating arsenic compounds, creates Cadet's fuming liquid, later discovered to be cacodyl oxide, considered to be the first synthetic organometallic compound.

=== 1758 ===
Joseph Black formulates the concept of latent heat to explain the thermochemistry of phase changes.

=== 1766 ===
Henry Cavendish discovers hydrogen as a colorless, odourless gas that burns and can form an explosive mixture with air.

=== 1773–1774 ===
Carl Wilhelm Scheele and Joseph Priestley independently isolate oxygen, called by Priestley "dephlogisticated air" and Scheele "fire air".

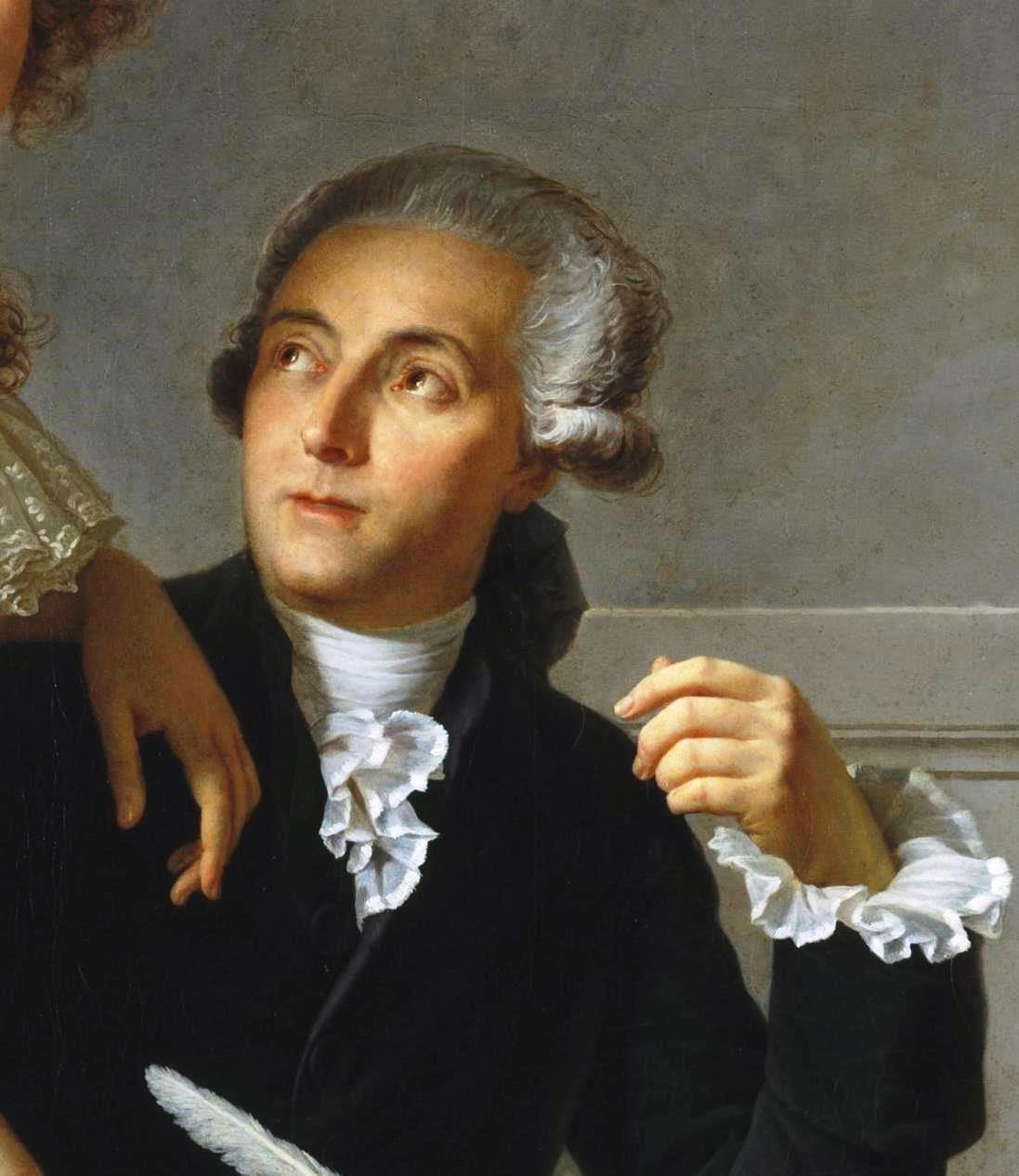
Antoine-Laurent de Lavoisier (1743–94) is considered the "Father of Modern Chemistry".

=== 1778 ===
Antoine Lavoisier, considered "The father of modern chemistry", recognizes and names oxygen, and recognizes its importance and role in combustion.

=== 1787 ===
Antoine Lavoisier publishes Méthode de nomenclature chimique, the first modern system of chemical nomenclature.

=== 1787 ===
Jacques Charles proposes Charles's law, a corollary of Boyle's law, describes relationship between temperature and volume of a gas.

=== 1789 ===
Antoine Lavoisier publishes Traité Élémentaire de Chimie, the first modern chemistry textbook. It is a complete survey of (at that time) modern chemistry, including the first concise definition of the law of conservation of mass, and thus also represents the founding of the discipline of stoichiometry or quantitative chemical analysis.

=== 1797 ===
Joseph Proust proposes the law of definite proportions, which states that elements always combine in small, whole number ratios to form compounds.

=== 1800 ===
Alessandro Volta devises the first chemical battery, thereby founding the discipline of electrochemistry.

== 19th century ==
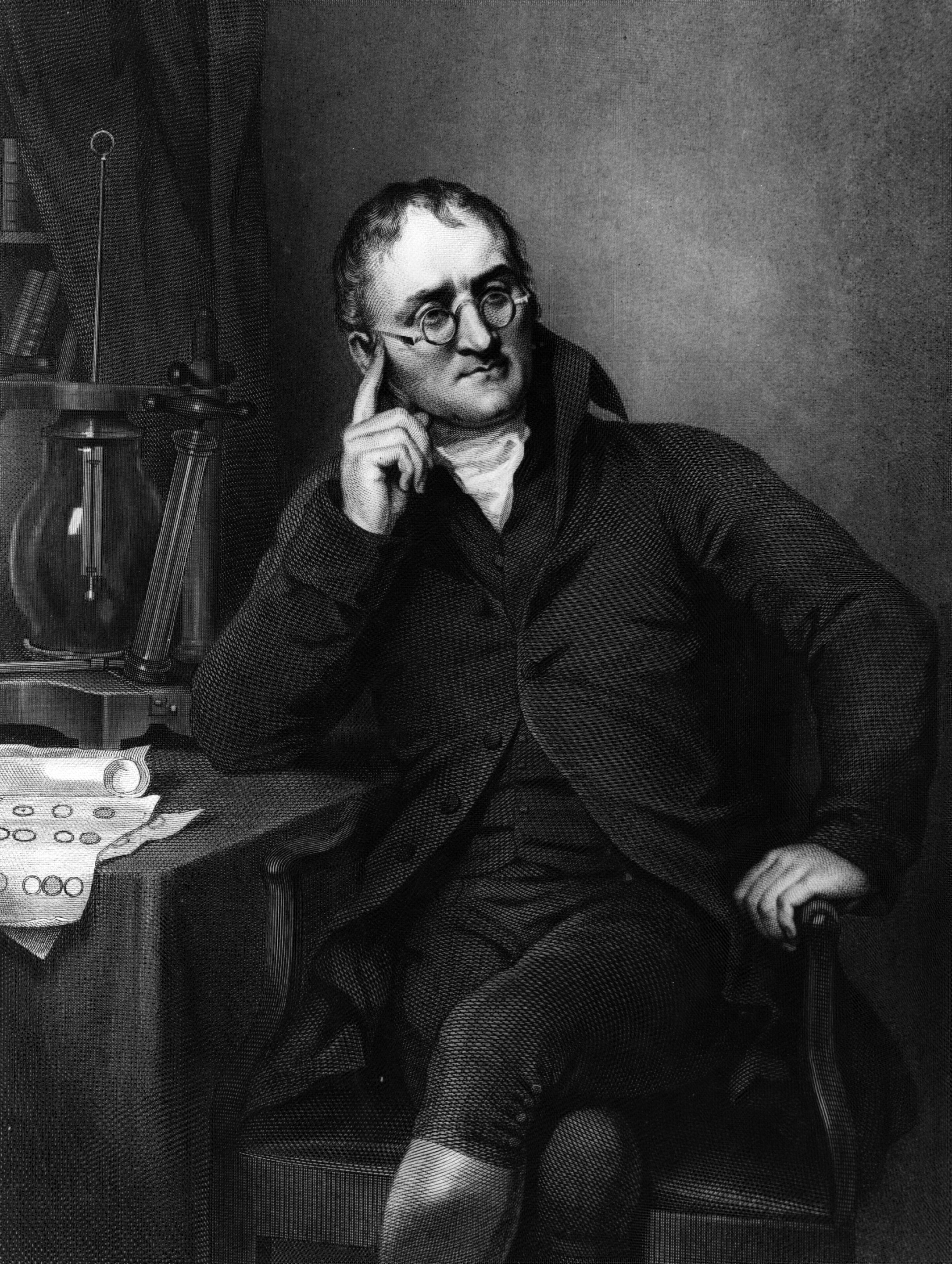
John Dalton (1766–1844)

=== 1803 ===
John Dalton proposes Dalton's law, which describes relationship between the components in a mixture of gases and the relative pressure each contributes to that of the overall mixture.

=== 1805 ===
Joseph Louis Gay-Lussac discovers that water is composed of two parts hydrogen and one part oxygen by volume.

=== 1808 ===
Joseph Louis Gay-Lussac collects and discovers several chemical and physical properties of air and of other gases, including experimental proofs of Boyle's and Charles's laws, and of relationships between density and composition of gases.

=== 1808 ===
John Dalton publishes New System of Chemical Philosophy, which contains first modern scientific description of the atomic theory, and clear description of the law of multiple proportions.

=== 1808 ===
Jöns Jakob Berzelius publishes Lärbok i Kemien in which he proposes modern chemical symbols and notation, and of the concept of relative atomic weight.

=== 1811 ===
Amedeo Avogadro proposes Avogadro's law, that equal volumes of gases under constant temperature and pressure contain equal number of molecules.

Structural formula of urea

=== 1825 ===
Friedrich Wöhler and Justus von Liebig perform the first confirmed discovery and explanation of isomers, earlier named by Berzelius. Working with cyanic acid and fulminic acid, they correctly deduce that isomerism was caused by differing arrangements of atoms within a molecular structure.

=== 1827 ===
William Prout classifies biomolecules into their modern groupings: carbohydrates, proteins and lipids.

=== 1828 ===
Friedrich Wöhler synthesizes urea, thereby establishing that organic compounds could be produced from inorganic starting materials, disproving the theory of vitalism.

=== 1832 ===
Friedrich Wöhler and Justus von Liebig discover and explain functional groups and radicals in relation to organic chemistry.

=== 1840 ===
Germain Hess proposes Hess's law, an early statement of the law of conservation of energy, which establishes that energy changes in a chemical process depend only on the states of the starting and product materials and not on the specific pathway taken between the two states.

=== 1847 ===
Hermann Kolbe obtains acetic acid from completely inorganic sources, further disproving vitalism.

=== 1848 ===
Lord Kelvin establishes concept of absolute zero, the temperature at which all molecular motion ceases.

=== 1849 ===
Louis Pasteur discovers that the racemic form of tartaric acid is a mixture of the levorotatory and dextrotatory forms, thus clarifying the nature of optical rotation and advancing the field of stereochemistry.

=== 1852 ===
August Beer proposes Beer's law, which explains the relationship between the composition of a mixture and the amount of light it will absorb. Based partly on earlier work by Pierre Bouguer and Johann Heinrich Lambert, it establishes the analytical technique known as spectrophotometry.

=== 1855 ===
Benjamin Silliman, Jr. pioneers methods of petroleum cracking, which makes the entire modern petrochemical industry possible.

=== 1856 ===
William Henry Perkin synthesizes Perkin's mauve, the first synthetic dye. Created as an accidental byproduct of an attempt to create quinine from coal tar. This discovery is the foundation of the dye synthesis industry, one of the earliest successful chemical industries.

=== 1857 ===
Friedrich August Kekulé von Stradonitz proposes that carbon is tetravalent, or forms exactly four chemical bonds.

=== 1859–1860 ===
Gustav Kirchhoff and Robert Bunsen lay the foundations of spectroscopy as a means of chemical analysis, which lead them to the discovery of caesium and rubidium. Other workers soon used the same technique to discover indium, thallium, and helium.

=== 1860 ===
Stanislao Cannizzaro, resurrecting Avogadro's ideas regarding diatomic molecules, compiles a table of atomic weights and presents it at the 1860 Karlsruhe Congress, ending decades of conflicting atomic weights and molecular formulas, and leading to Mendeleev's discovery of the periodic law.

=== 1862 ===
Alexander Parkes exhibits Parkesine, one of the earliest synthetic polymers, at the International Exhibition in London. This discovery formed the foundation of the modern plastics industry.

=== 1862 ===
Alexandre-Emile Béguyer de Chancourtois publishes the telluric helix, an early, three-dimensional version of the periodic table of the elements.

=== 1864 ===
John Newlands proposes the law of octaves, a precursor to the periodic law.

=== 1864 ===
Lothar Meyer develops an early version of the periodic table, with 28 elements organized by valence.

=== 1864 ===
Cato Maximilian Guldberg and Peter Waage, building on Claude Louis Berthollet's ideas, proposed the law of mass action.

=== 1865 ===
Johann Josef Loschmidt determines exact number of molecules in a mole, later named Avogadro constant.

=== 1865 ===
Friedrich August Kekulé von Stradonitz, based partially on the work of Loschmidt and others, establishes structure of benzene as a six carbon ring with alternating single and double bonds.

=== 1865 ===
Adolf von Baeyer begins work on indigo dye, a milestone in modern industrial organic chemistry which revolutionizes the dye industry.

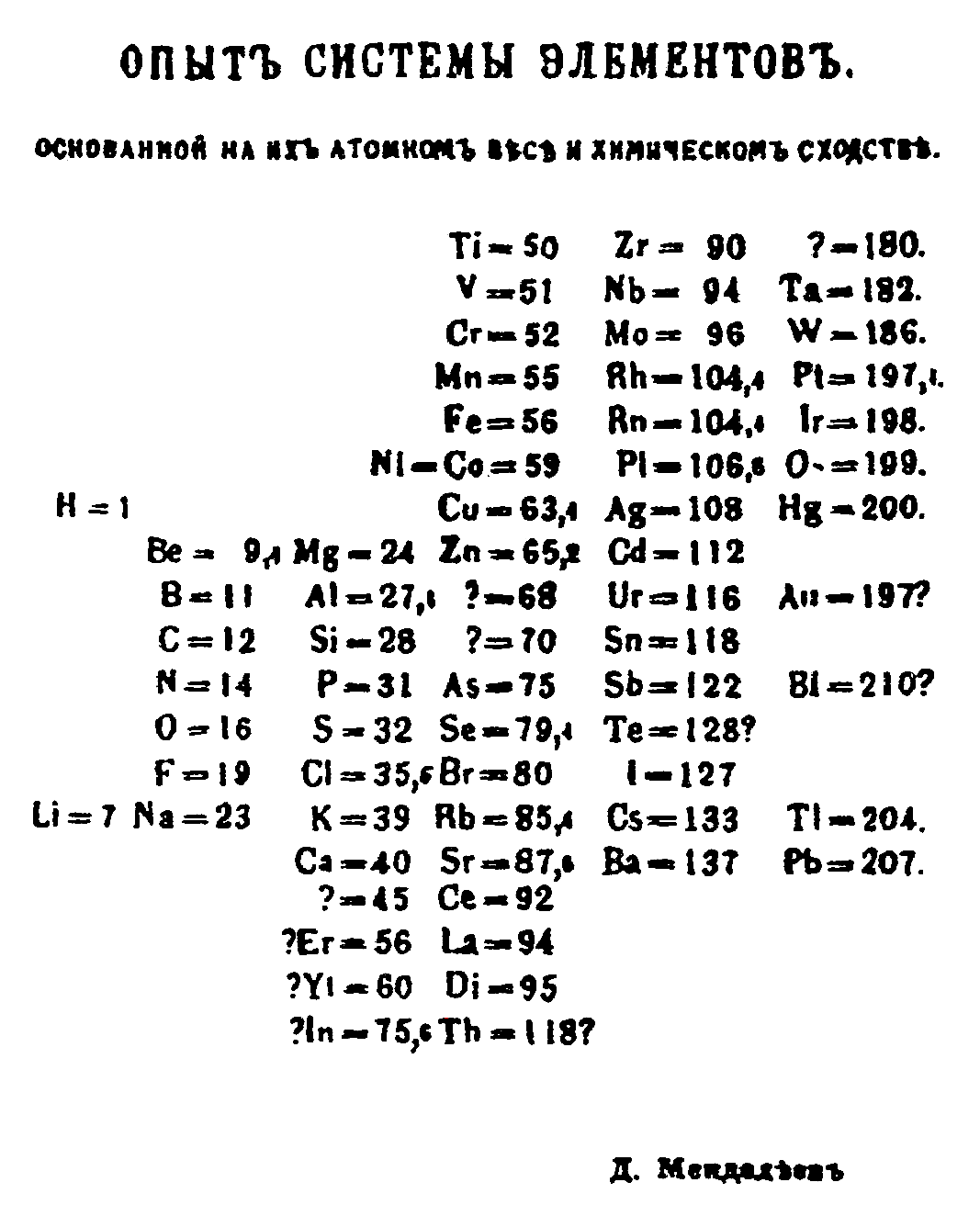
Mendeleev's 1869 Periodic table

=== 1869 ===
Dmitri Mendeleev publishes the first modern periodic table, with the 66 known elements organized by atomic weights. The strength of his table was its ability to accurately predict the properties of as-yet unknown elements.

=== 1873 ===
Jacobus Henricus van 't Hoff and Joseph Achille Le Bel, working independently, develop a model of chemical bonding that explains the chirality experiments of Pasteur and provides a physical cause for optical activity in chiral compounds.

=== 1876 ===
Josiah Willard Gibbs publishes On the Equilibrium of Heterogeneous Substances, a compilation of his work on thermodynamics and physical chemistry which lays out the concept of free energy to explain the physical basis of chemical equilibria.

=== 1877 ===
Ludwig Boltzmann establishes statistical derivations of many important physical and chemical concepts, including entropy, and distributions of molecular velocities in the gas phase.

=== 1883 ===
Svante Arrhenius develops ion theory to explain conductivity in electrolytes.

=== 1884 ===
Jacobus Henricus van 't Hoff publishes Études de Dynamique chimique, a seminal study on chemical kinetics.

=== 1884 ===
Hermann Emil Fischer proposes structure of purine, a key structure in many biomolecules, which he later synthesized in 1898. Also begins work on the chemistry of glucose and related sugars.

=== 1884 ===
Henry Louis Le Chatelier develops Le Chatelier's principle, which explains the response of dynamic chemical equilibria to external stresses.

=== 1885 ===
Eugen Goldstein names the cathode ray, later discovered to be composed of electrons, and the canal ray, later discovered to be positive hydrogen ions that had been stripped of their electrons in a cathode ray tube. These would later be named protons.

=== 1893 ===
Alfred Werner discovers the octahedral structure of cobalt complexes, thus establishing the field of coordination chemistry.

=== 1894–1898 ===
William Ramsay discovers the noble gases, which fill a large and unexpected gap in the periodic table and led to models of chemical bonding.

=== 1897 ===
J. J. Thomson discovers the electron using the cathode ray tube.

=== 1898 ===
Wilhelm Wien demonstrates that canal rays (streams of positive ions) can be deflected by magnetic fields, and that the amount of deflection is proportional to the mass-to-charge ratio. This discovery would lead to the analytical technique known as mass spectrometry.

=== 1898 ===
Maria Sklodowska-Curie and Pierre Curie isolate radium and polonium from pitchblende.

=== c. 1900 ===
Ernest Rutherford discovers the source of radioactivity as decaying atoms; coins terms for various types of radiation.

== 20th century ==
=== 1903 ===
Mikhail Semyonovich Tsvet invents chromatography, an important analytic technique.

=== 1904 ===
Hantaro Nagaoka proposes an early nuclear model of the atom, where electrons orbit a dense massive nucleus.

=== 1905 ===
Fritz Haber and Carl Bosch develop the Haber process for making ammonia from its elements, a milestone in industrial chemistry with deep consequences in agriculture.

=== 1905 ===
Albert Einstein explains Brownian motion in a way that definitively proves atomic theory.

=== 1907 ===
Leo Hendrik Baekeland invents bakelite, one of the first commercially successful plastics.

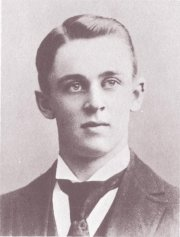
Robert A. Millikan performed the oil drop experiment.

=== 1909 ===
Robert Millikan measures the charge of individual electrons with unprecedented accuracy through the oil drop experiment, confirming that all electrons have the same charge and mass.

=== 1909 ===
S. P. L. Sørensen invents the pH concept and develops methods for measuring acidity.

=== 1911 ===
Antonius van den Broek proposes the idea that the elements on the periodic table are more properly organized by positive nuclear charge rather than atomic weight.

=== 1911 ===
The first Solvay Conference is held in Brussels, bringing together most of the most prominent scientists of the day. Conferences in physics and chemistry continue to be held periodically to this day.

=== 1911 ===
Ernest Rutherford, Hans Geiger, and Ernest Marsden perform the gold foil experiment, which proves the nuclear model of the atom, with a small, dense, positive nucleus surrounded by a diffuse electron cloud.

=== 1912 ===
William Henry Bragg and William Lawrence Bragg propose Bragg's law and establish the field of X-ray crystallography, an important tool for elucidating the crystal structure of substances.

=== 1912 ===
Peter Debye develops the concept of molecular dipole to describe asymmetric charge distribution in some molecules.

The Bohr model of the atom

=== 1913 ===
Niels Bohr introduces concepts of quantum mechanics to atomic structure by proposing what is now known as the Bohr model of the atom, where electrons exist only in strictly defined orbitals.

=== 1913 ===
Henry Moseley, working from Van den Broek's earlier idea, introduces concept of atomic number to fix inadequacies of Mendeleev's periodic table, which had been based on atomic weight.

=== 1913 ===
Frederick Soddy proposes the concept of isotopes, that elements with the same chemical properties may have differing atomic weights.

=== 1913 ===
J. J. Thomson expanding on the work of Wien, shows that charged subatomic particles can be separated by their mass-to-charge ratio, a technique known as mass spectrometry.

=== 1916 ===
Gilbert N. Lewis publishes "The Atom and the Molecule", the foundation of valence bond theory.

=== 1921 ===
Otto Stern and Walther Gerlach establish concept of quantum mechanical spin in subatomic particles.

=== 1923 ===
Gilbert N. Lewis and Merle Randall publish Thermodynamics and the Free Energy of Chemical Substances, first modern treatise on chemical thermodynamics.

=== 1923 ===
Gilbert N. Lewis develops the electron pair theory of acid/base reactions.

=== 1924 ===
Louis de Broglie introduces the wave-model of atomic structure, based on the ideas of wave–particle duality.

=== 1925 ===
Wolfgang Pauli develops the exclusion principle, which states that no two electrons around a single nucleus may have the same quantum state, as described by four quantum numbers.

$H(t) | \psi (t) \rangle = i \hbar \frac{d}{d t} | \psi (t) \rangle$
The Schrödinger equation

1926
Erwin Schrödinger proposes the Schrödinger equation, which provides a mathematical basis for the wave model of atomic structure.

=== 1927 ===
Werner Heisenberg develops the uncertainty principle which, among other things, explains the mechanics of electron motion around the nucleus.

=== 1927 ===
Fritz London and Walter Heitler apply quantum mechanics to explain covalent bonding in the hydrogen molecule, which marked the birth of quantum chemistry.

=== 1929 ===
Linus Pauling publishes Pauling's rules, which are key principles for the use of X-ray crystallography to deduce molecular structure.

=== 1931 ===
Erich Hückel proposes Hückel's rule, which explains when a planar ring molecule will have aromatic properties.

=== 1931 ===
Harold Urey discovers deuterium by fractionally distilling liquid hydrogen.

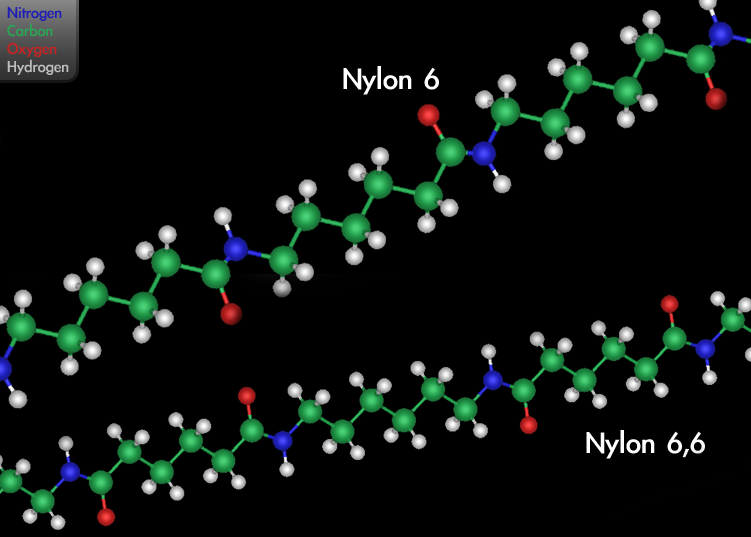
Model of two common forms of nylon

=== 1932 ===
James Chadwick discovers the neutron.

=== 1932–1934 ===
Linus Pauling and Robert Mulliken quantify electronegativity, devising the scales that now bear their names.

=== 1935 ===
Wallace Carothers leads a team of chemists at DuPont who invent nylon, one of the most commercially successful synthetic polymers in history.

=== 1937 ===
Carlo Perrier and Emilio Segrè perform the first confirmed synthesis of technetium-97, the first artificially produced element, filling a gap in the periodic table. Though disputed, the element may have been synthesized as early as 1925 by Walter Noddack and others.

=== 1937 ===
Eugene Houdry develops a method of industrial scale catalytic cracking of petroleum, leading to the development of the first modern oil refinery.

=== 1937 ===
Pyotr Kapitsa, John Allen and Don Misener produce supercooled helium-4, the first zero-viscosity superfluid, a substance that displays quantum mechanical properties on a macroscopic scale.

=== 1939 ===
Otto Hahn and Lise Meitner discover the process of nuclear fission in uranium.

=== 1939 ===
Linus Pauling publishes The Nature of the Chemical Bond, a compilation of a decades worth of work on chemical bonding. It is one of the most important modern chemical texts. It explains hybridization theory, covalent bonding and ionic bonding as explained through electronegativity, and resonance as a means to explain, among other things, the structure of benzene.

=== 1940 ===
Edwin McMillan and Philip H. Abelson identify neptunium, the lightest and first synthesized transuranium element, found in the products of uranium fission. McMillan would found a lab at Berkeley that would be involved in the discovery of many new elements and isotopes.

=== 1941 ===
Glenn T. Seaborg takes over McMillan's work creating new atomic nuclei. Pioneers method of neutron capture and later through other nuclear reactions. Would become the principal or co-discoverer of nine new chemical elements, and dozens of new isotopes of existing elements.

=== 1944 ===
Robert Burns Woodward and William von Eggers Doering successfully synthesized of quinine. This achievement, characterized of fully artificial chemicals as source for synthesis process, opened an era called as "Woodwardian era" or "chemical era" when many drugs and chemicals, as well as organic synthesis methods invented. Due to the growth of chemical industry, many fields has grown, such as drug industry.

=== 1945–1946 ===
Felix Bloch and Edward Mills Purcell develop the process of nuclear magnetic resonance, an analytical technique important in elucidating structures of molecules, especially in organic chemistry.

Jacob A. Marinsky, Lawrence E. Glendenin, and Charles D. Coryell perform the first confirmed synthesis of Promethium, filling in the last "gap" in the periodic table.

=== 1951 ===
Linus Pauling uses X-ray crystallography to deduce the secondary structure of proteins.

=== 1952 ===
Alan Walsh pioneers the field of atomic absorption spectroscopy, an important quantitative spectroscopy method that allows one to measure specific concentrations of a material in a mixture.

=== 1952 ===
Robert Burns Woodward, Geoffrey Wilkinson, and Ernst Otto Fischer discover the structure of ferrocene, one of the founding discoveries of the field of organometallic chemistry.

=== 1953 ===
James D. Watson and Francis Crick propose the structure of DNA, opening the door to the field of molecular biology.

=== 1957 ===
Jens Skou discovers Na⁺/K⁺-ATPase, the first ion-transporting enzyme.

=== 1958 ===
Max Perutz and John Kendrew use X-ray crystallography to elucidate a protein structure, specifically sperm whale myoglobin.

=== 1962 ===
Neil Bartlett synthesizes xenon hexafluoroplatinate, showing for the first time that the noble gases can form chemical compounds.

=== 1962 ===
George Olah observes carbocations via superacid reactions.

=== 1964 ===
Richard R. Ernst performs experiments that will lead to the development of the technique of Fourier transform NMR. This would greatly increase the sensitivity of the technique, and open the door for magnetic resonance imaging or MRI.

=== 1965 ===
Robert Burns Woodward and Roald Hoffmann propose the Woodward–Hoffmann rules, which use the symmetry of molecular orbitals to explain the stereochemistry of chemical reactions.

=== 1966 ===
Hitoshi Nozaki and Ryōji Noyori discovered the first example of asymmetric catalysis (hydrogenation) using a structurally well-defined chiral transition metal complex.

=== 1970 ===
John Pople develops the Gaussian program greatly easing computational chemistry calculations.

=== 1971 ===
Yves Chauvin offered an explanation of the reaction mechanism of olefin metathesis reactions.

=== 1975 ===
Karl Barry Sharpless and group discover a stereoselective oxidation reactions including Sharpless epoxidation, Sharpless asymmetric dihydroxylation, and Sharpless oxyamination.

Buckminsterfullerene, C_{60}

=== 1985 ===
Harold Kroto, Robert Curl and Richard Smalley discover fullerenes, a class of large carbon molecules superficially resembling the geodesic dome designed by architect R. Buckminster Fuller.

=== 1991 ===
Sumio Iijima uses electron microscopy to discover a type of cylindrical fullerene known as a carbon nanotube, though earlier work had been done in the field as early as 1951. This material is an important component in the field of nanotechnology.

=== 1994 ===
First total synthesis of Taxol by Robert A. Holton and his group.

=== 1995 ===
Eric Cornell and Carl Wieman produce the first Bose–Einstein condensate, a substance that displays quantum mechanical properties on the macroscopic scale.

== See also ==
- History of chemistry
- Nobel Prize in chemistry
- List of Nobel laureates in Chemistry
- Timeline of chemical elements discoveries
- Timeline of women in science
