= Ninu =

Ninu may refer to:

- -ninu, ancient perfume-maker who worked with Tapputi
- Emil Ninu (born 1986), Romanian football player
- Ninu Cremona (1880–1972), Maltese writer and health inspector
- Ninu Zammit (born 1952), Maltese politician
