= Reactivity series =

Chemical Property

In chemistry, a reactivity series (or reactivity series of elements) is an empirical, calculated, and structurally analytical progression of a series of metals, arranged by their "reactivity" from highest to lowest. It is used to summarize information about the reactions of metals with acids and water, single displacement reactions and the extraction of metals from their ores.

== Table ==
| Metal | Ion | Reactivity | Extraction |
|---|---|---|---|
| Caesium Cs | Cs^{+} | reacts with cold water | Electrolysis (a.k.a. electrolytic refining) |
| Rubidium Rb | Rb^{+} | reacts with cold water | Electrolysis (a.k.a. electrolytic refining) |
| Potassium K | K^{+} | reacts with cold water | Electrolysis (a.k.a. electrolytic refining) |
| Sodium Na | Na^{+} | reacts with cold water | Electrolysis (a.k.a. electrolytic refining) |
| Lithium Li | Li^{+} | reacts with cold water | Electrolysis (a.k.a. electrolytic refining) |
| Barium Ba | Ba^{2+} | reacts with cold water | Electrolysis (a.k.a. electrolytic refining) |
| Strontium Sr | Sr^{2+} | reacts with cold water | Electrolysis (a.k.a. electrolytic refining) |
| Calcium Ca | Ca^{2+} | reacts with cold water | Electrolysis (a.k.a. electrolytic refining) |
| Magnesium Mg | Mg^{2+} | reacts very slowly with cold water, but rapidly in boiling water, and very vigorously with acids | Electrolysis (a.k.a. electrolytic refining) |
| Beryllium Be | Be^{2+} | reacts with acids and steam | Electrolysis (a.k.a. electrolytic refining) |
| Aluminium Al | Al^{3+} | reacts with acids and steam | Electrolysis (a.k.a. electrolytic refining) |
| Titanium Ti | Ti^{4+} | reacts with concentrated mineral acids | pyrometallurgical extraction using magnesium, or less commonly other alkali metals, hydrogen or calcium in the Kroll process |
| Manganese Mn | Mn^{2+} | reacts with acids; very poor reaction with steam | smelting with coke |
| Zinc Zn | Zn^{2+} | reacts with acids; very poor reaction with steam | smelting with coke |
| Chromium Cr | Cr^{3+} | reacts with acids; very poor reaction with steam | aluminothermic reaction |
| Iron Fe | Fe^{2+} | reacts with acids; very poor reaction with steam | smelting with coke |
| Cadmium Cd | Cd^{2+} | reacts with acids; very poor reaction with steam | smelting with coke |
| Cobalt Co | Co^{2+} | reacts with acids; very poor reaction with steam | smelting with coke |
| Nickel Ni | Ni^{2+} | reacts with acids; very poor reaction with steam | smelting with coke |
| Tin Sn | Sn^{2+} | reacts with acids; very poor reaction with steam | smelting with coke |
| Lead Pb | Pb^{2+} | reacts with acids; very poor reaction with steam | smelting with coke |
| Antimony Sb | Sb^{3+} | may react with some strong oxidizing acids | heat or physical extraction |
| Bismuth Bi | Bi^{3+} | may react with some strong oxidizing acids | heat or physical extraction |
| Copper Cu | Cu^{2+} | reacts slowly with air | heat or physical extraction |
| Tungsten W | W^{3+} | may react with some strong oxidizing acids | heat or physical extraction |
| Mercury Hg | Hg^{2+} | may react with some strong oxidizing acids | heat or physical extraction |
| Silver Ag | Ag^{+} | may react with some strong oxidizing acids | heat or physical extraction |
| Gold Au | Au^{3+} | may react with some strong oxidizing acids | heat or physical extraction |
| Platinum Pt | Pt^{4+} | may react with some strong oxidizing acids | heat or physical extraction |

Going from the bottom to the top of the table the metals:

- increase in reactivity;
- lose electrons (oxidize) more readily to form positive ions;
- corrode or tarnish more readily;
- require more energy (and different methods) to be isolated from their compounds;
- become stronger reducing agents (electron donors).

== Defining reactions ==
There is no unique and fully consistent way to define the reactivity series, but it is common to use the three types of reaction listed below, many of which can be performed in a high-school laboratory (at least as demonstrations).

=== Reaction with water and acids ===
The most reactive metals, such as sodium, will react with cold water to produce hydrogen and the metal hydroxide:

2 Na (s) + 2 H_{2}O (l) → 2 NaOH (aq) + H_{2} (g)

Slightly less reactive metals, such as magnesium and zinc, do not react readily with cold water, but will react with steam to produce hydrogen and the metal oxide:

Mg (s) + H_{2}O (g) → MgO (s) + H_{2} (g)

Metals in the middle of the reactivity series, such as iron, will react with acids such as sulfuric acid (but not water at normal temperatures) to give hydrogen and a metal salt, such as iron(II) sulfate:

Fe (s) + H_{2}SO_{4} (aq) → FeSO_{4} (aq) + H_{2} (g)

There is some ambiguity at the borderlines between the groups. Magnesium, aluminium and zinc can react with water, but the reaction is usually very slow unless the metal samples are specially prepared to remove the surface passivation layer of oxide which protects the rest of the metal. Copper and silver will react with nitric acid; but because nitric acid is an oxidizing acid, the oxidizing agent is not the H^{+} ion as in normal acids, but the NO_{3}^{−} ion.

== Comparison with standard electrode potentials ==
The reactivity series is sometimes quoted in the strict reverse order of standard electrode potentials, when it is also known as the "electrochemical series".

The following list includes the metallic elements of the first six periods. It is mostly based on tables provided by NIST. However, not all sources give the same values: there are some differences between the precise values given by NIST and the CRC Handbook of Chemistry and Physics. In the first six periods this does not make a difference to the relative order, but in the seventh period it does, so the seventh-period elements have been excluded. (In any case, the typical oxidation states for the most accessible seventh-period elements thorium and uranium are too high to allow a direct comparison.)

Hydrogen has been included as a benchmark, although it is not a metal. Borderline germanium, antimony, and astatine have been included. Some other elements in the middle of the 4d and 5d rows have been omitted (Zr–Tc, Hf–Os) when their simple cations are too highly charged or of rather doubtful existence. Greyed-out rows indicate values based on estimation rather than experiment.

| Z | Sym | Element | Reaction | E° (V) |
|---|---|---|---|---|
| 3 | Li | lithium | Li^{+} + e^{−} → Li | −3.04 |
| 55 | Cs | caesium | Cs^{+} + e^{−} → Cs | −3.03 |
| 37 | Rb | rubidium | Rb^{+} + e^{−} → Rb | −2.94 |
| 19 | K | potassium | K^{+} + e^{−} → K | −2.94 |
| 56 | Ba | barium | Ba^{2+} + 2 e^{−} → Ba | −2.91 |
| 38 | Sr | strontium | Sr^{2+} + 2 e^{−} → Sr | −2.90 |
| 20 | Ca | calcium | Ca^{2+} + 2 e^{−} → Ca | −2.87 |
| 11 | Na | sodium | Na^{+} + e^{−} → Na | −2.71 |
| 57 | La | lanthanum | La^{3+} + 3 e^{−} → La | −2.38 |
| 39 | Y | yttrium | Y^{3+} + 3 e^{−} → Y | −2.38 |
| 12 | Mg | magnesium | Mg^{2+} + 2 e^{−} → Mg | −2.36 |
| 59 | Pr | praseodymium | Pr^{3+} + 3 e^{−} → Pr | −2.35 |
| 58 | Ce | cerium | Ce^{3+} + 3 e^{−} → Ce | −2.34 |
| 68 | Er | erbium | Er^{3+} + 3 e^{−} → Er | −2.33 |
| 67 | Ho | holmium | Ho^{3+} + 3 e^{−} → Ho | −2.33 |
| 60 | Nd | neodymium | Nd^{3+} + 3 e^{−} → Nd | −2.32 |
| 69 | Tm | thulium | Tm^{3+} + 3 e^{−} → Tm | −2.32 |
| 62 | Sm | samarium | Sm^{3+} + 3 e^{−} → Sm | −2.30 |
| 61 | Pm | promethium | Pm^{3+} + 3 e^{−} → Pm | −2.30 |
| 66 | Dy | dysprosium | Dy^{3+} + 3 e^{−} → Dy | −2.29 |
| 71 | Lu | lutetium | Lu^{3+} + 3 e^{−} → Lu | −2.28 |
| 65 | Tb | terbium | Tb^{3+} + 3 e^{−} → Tb | −2.28 |
| 64 | Gd | gadolinium | Gd^{3+} + 3 e^{−} → Gd | −2.28 |
| 70 | Yb | ytterbium | Yb^{3+} + 3 e^{−} → Yb | −2.19 |
| 21 | Sc | scandium | Sc^{3+} + 3 e^{−} → Sc | −2.09 |
| 63 | Eu | europium | Eu^{3+} + 3 e^{−} → Eu | −1.99 |
| 4 | Be | beryllium | Be^{2+} + 2 e^{−} → Be | −1.97 |
| 13 | Al | aluminium | Al^{3+} + 3 e^{−} → Al | −1.68 |
| 22 | Ti | titanium | Ti^{3+} + 3 e^{−} → Ti | −1.37 |
| 25 | Mn | manganese | Mn^{2+} + 2 e^{−} → Mn | −1.18 |
| 23 | V | vanadium | V^{2+} + 2 e^{−} → V | −1.12 |
| 24 | Cr | chromium | Cr^{2+} + 2 e^{−} → Cr | −0.89 |
| 30 | Zn | zinc | Zn^{2+} + 2 e^{−} → Zn | −0.76 |
| 31 | Ga | gallium | Ga^{3+} + 3 e^{−} → Ga | −0.55 |
| 26 | Fe | iron | Fe^{2+} + 2 e^{−} → Fe | −0.44 |
| 48 | Cd | cadmium | Cd^{2+} + 2 e^{−} → Cd | −0.40 |
| 49 | In | indium | In^{3+} + 3 e^{−} → In | −0.34 |
| 81 | Tl | thallium | Tl^{+} + e^{−} → Tl | −0.34 |
| 27 | Co | cobalt | Co^{2+} + 2 e^{−} → Co | −0.28 |
| 28 | Ni | nickel | Ni^{2+} + 2 e^{−} → Ni | −0.24 |
| 50 | Sn | tin | Sn^{2+} + 2 e^{−} → Sn | −0.14 |
| 82 | Pb | lead | Pb^{2+} + 2 e^{−} → Pb | −0.13 |
| 1 | H | hydrogen | 2 H^{+} + 2 e^{−} → H_{2} | 0.00 |
| 32 | Ge | germanium | Ge^{2+} + 2 e^{−} → Ge | +0.1 |
| 51 | Sb | antimony | Sb^{3+} + 3 e^{−} → Sb | +0.15 |
| 83 | Bi | bismuth | Bi^{3+} + 3 e^{−} → Bi | +0.31 |
| 29 | Cu | copper | Cu^{2+} + 2 e^{−} → Cu | +0.34 |
| 84 | Po | polonium | Po^{2+} + 2 e^{−} → Po | +0.6 |
| 44 | Ru | ruthenium | Ru^{3+} + 3 e^{−} → Ru | +0.60 |
| 45 | Rh | rhodium | Rh^{3+} + 3 e^{−} → Rh | +0.76 |
| 47 | Ag | silver | Ag^{+} + e^{−} → Ag | +0.80 |
| 80 | Hg | mercury | Hg^{2+} + 2 e^{−} → Hg | +0.85 |
| 46 | Pd | palladium | Pd^{2+} + 2 e^{−} → Pd | +0.92 |
| 77 | Ir | iridium | Ir^{3+} + 3 e^{−} → Ir | +1.0 |
| 85 | At | astatine | At^{+} + e^{−} → At | +1.0 |
| 78 | Pt | platinum | Pt^{2+} + 2 e^{−} → Pt | +1.18 |
| 79 | Au | gold | Au^{3+} + 3 e^{−} → Au | +1.50 |

The positions of lithium and sodium are changed on such a series.

Standard electrode potentials offer a quantitative measure of the power of a reducing agent, rather than the qualitative considerations of other reactive series. However, they are only valid for standard conditions: in particular, they only apply to reactions in aqueous solution. Even with this proviso, the electrode potentials of lithium and sodium – and hence their positions in the electrochemical series – appear anomalous. The order of reactivity, as shown by the vigour of the reaction with water or the speed at which the metal surface tarnishes in air, appears to be

Cs > K > Na > Li > alkaline earth metals,

i.e., alkali metals > alkaline earth metals,

the same as the reverse order of the (gas-phase) ionization energies. This is borne out by the extraction of metallic lithium by the electrolysis of a eutectic mixture of lithium chloride and potassium chloride: lithium metal is formed at the cathode, not potassium.

== Comparison with electronegativity values ==
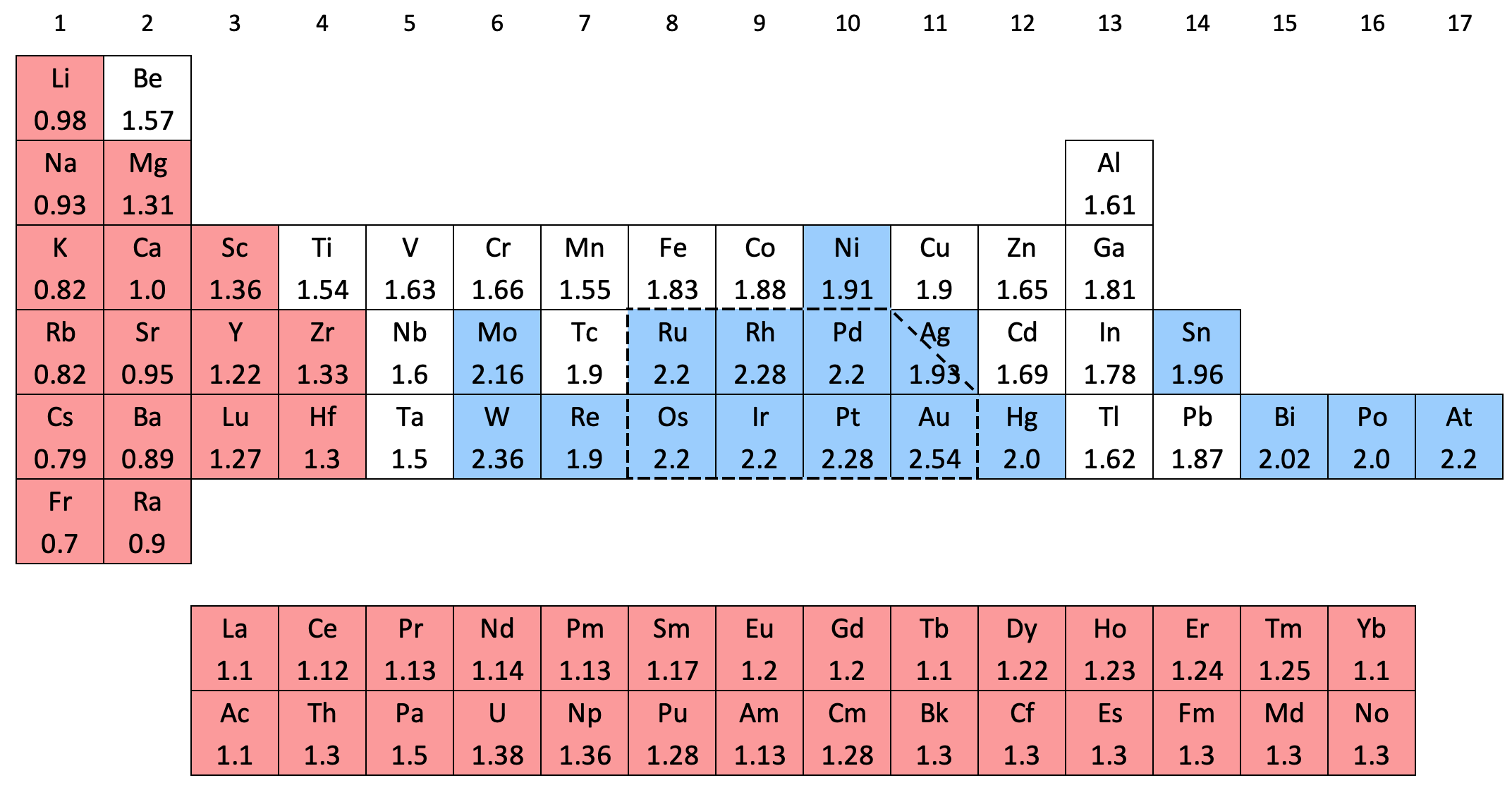

The image shows a periodic table extract with the electronegativity values of metals.

Wulfsberg distinguishes:
very electropositive metals with electronegativity values below 1.4
electropositive metals with values between 1.4 and 1.9; and
electronegative metals with values between 1.9 and 2.54.

From the image, the group 1–2 metals and the lanthanides and actinides are very electropositive to electropositive; the transition metals in groups 3 to 12 are very electropositive to electronegative; and the post-transition metals are electropositive to electronegative. The noble metals, inside the dashed border (as a subset of the transition metals) are very electronegative.

== See also ==
- Reactivity (chemistry), which discusses the inconsistent way that the term "reactivity" is used in chemistry.
