= Chemical equation =

Symbolic representation of a chemical reaction

A chemical equation is the symbolic representation (notation) of a chemical reaction in the form of symbols and chemical formulas. The reactant entities are given on the left-hand side, and the product entities are on the right-hand side with a plus sign between the entities in both the reactants and the products, and an arrow that points towards the products to show the direction of the reaction. The chemical formulas may be symbolic, structural (pictorial diagrams), or intermixed. The coefficients next to the symbols and formulas of entities are the absolute values of the stoichiometric numbers. The first chemical equation was diagrammed by Jean Beguin in 1615.

== Structure ==
A chemical equation (see an example below) consists of a list of reactants (the starting substances) on the left-hand side, an arrow symbol, and a list of products (substances formed in the chemical reaction) on the right-hand side. Each substance is specified by its chemical formula, optionally preceded by a number called stoichiometric coefficient. (Note: Not to be confused with a related quantity called stoichiometric number.) The coefficient specifies how many entities (e.g. molecules) of that substance are involved in the reaction on a molecular basis. If not written explicitly, the coefficient is equal to 1. Multiple substances on any side of the equation are separated from each other by a plus sign.

As an example, the equation for the reaction of hydrochloric acid with sodium can be denoted:

2HCl + 2Na → 2NaCl + H_{2}

Given the formulas are fairly simple, this equation could be read as "two H-C-L plus two N-A yields (Note: Not to be confused with yield (chemistry), a quantification of synthesis efficiency.) two N-A-C-L and H two." Alternately, and in general for equations involving complex chemicals, the chemical formulas are read using IUPAC nomenclature, which could verbalise this equation as "two hydrochloric acid molecules and two sodium atoms react to form two formula units of sodium chloride and a hydrogen gas molecule."

=== Reaction types ===
Different variants of the arrow symbol are used to denote the type of a reaction:

$\rightarrow$	net forward reaction
$\rightleftarrows$	reaction in both directions (Note: The notation ⇄ was proposed in 1884 by the Dutch chemist Jacobus Henricus van 't Hoff. Van 't Hoff called reactions that didn't proceed to completion "limited reactions". He wrote (translation from French): Now Mr. Pfaundler has joined these two phenomena in a single concept by considering the observed limit as the result of two opposing reactions, driving the one in the example cited to the formation of sea salt [i.e., NaCl] and nitric acid, [and] the other to hydrochloric acid and sodium nitrate. This consideration, which experiment validates, justifies the expression "chemical equilibrium", which is used to characterize the final state of limited reactions. I would propose to translate this expression by the following symbol: HCl + NO_{3} Na ⇄ NO_{3} H + Cl Na. I thus replace, in this case, the = sign in the chemical equation by the sign ⇄, which in reality doesn't express just equality but shows also the direction of the reaction. This clearly expresses that a chemical action occurs simultaneously in two opposing directions.)
$\rightleftharpoons$	equilibrium (Note: The notation $\ce{<=>}$ was suggested by Hugh Marshall in 1902.)
$=$	stoichiometric relation
$\leftrightarrow$	resonance (not a reaction)

=== State of matter ===
To indicate physical state of a chemical, a symbol in parentheses may be appended to its formula: (s) for a solid, (l) for a liquid, (g) for a gas, and (aq) for an aqueous solution. This is especially done when one wishes to emphasize the states or changes thereof. For example, the reaction of aqueous hydrochloric acid with solid (metallic) sodium to form aqueous sodium chloride and hydrogen gas would be written like this:

2HCl(aq) + 2Na(s) → 2NaCl(aq) + H_{2}(g)

That reaction would have different thermodynamic and kinetic properties if gaseous hydrogen chloride were to replace the hydrochloric acid as a reactant:

2HCl(g) + 2Na(s) → 2NaCl(s) + H_{2}(g)

Alternately, an arrow without parentheses is used in some cases to indicate formation of a gas ↑ or precipitate ↓. This is especially useful if only one such species is formed. Here is an example indicating that hydrogen gas is formed:

2HCl + 2Na → 2 NaCl + H_{2} ↑

=== Catalysis and other conditions ===
The Baker–Venkataraman rearrangement needs a base as a catalyst.

If the reaction requires energy, it is indicated above the arrow. A capital Greek letter delta (Δ) or a triangle (△) (Note: Triangle (△) was originally the alchemical symbol for fire.) is put on the reaction arrow to show that energy in the form of heat is added to the reaction. The expression hν (Note: This expression comes from the Planck equation for the energy of a photon, E = hν. The Greek letter ν ("nu") is sometimes mistakenly replaced with a Latin letter v ("vee").) is used as a symbol for the addition of energy in the form of light. Other symbols are used for other specific types of energy or radiation.

Similarly, if a reaction requires a certain medium with certain specific characteristics, then the name of the acid or base that is used as a medium may be placed on top of the arrow. If no specific acid or base is required, another way of denoting the use of an acidic or basic medium is to write H^{+} or OH^{−} (or even "acid" or "base") on top of the arrow. Specific conditions of the temperature and pressure, as well as the presence of catalysts, may be indicated in the same way.

=== Notation variants ===
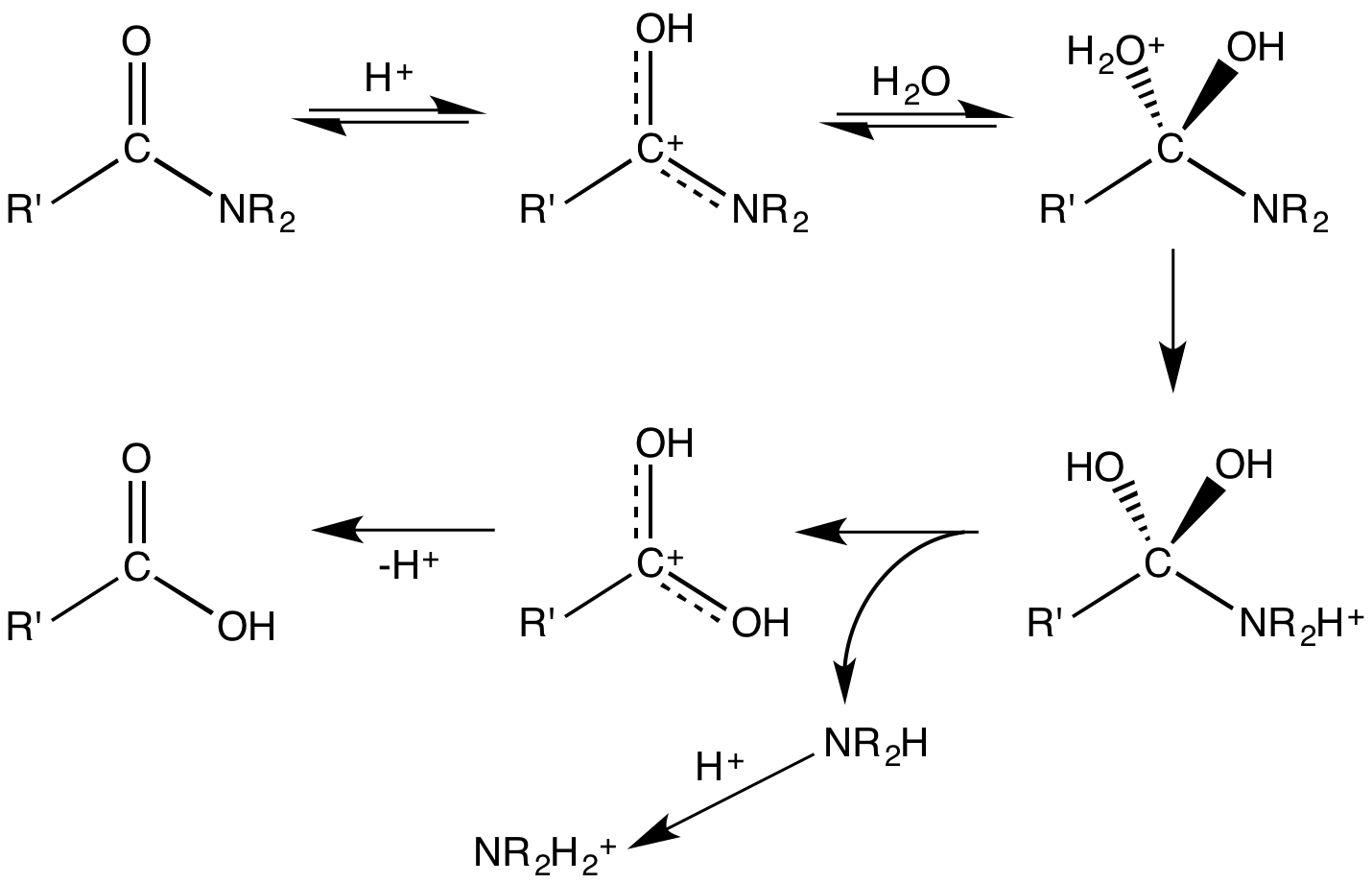
This illustration of a mechanism for acid-catalyzed hydrolysis of an amide puts some reactants and products above the arrows and to their branches to allow chaining of the chemical "equations".

The standard notation for chemical equations only permits all reactants on one side, all products on the other, and all stoichiometric coefficients positive. For example, the usual form of the equation for dehydration of methanol to dimethylether is:

2 CH_{3}OH → CH_{3}OCH_{3} + H_{2}O

Sometimes an extension is used, where some substances with their stoichiometric coefficients are moved above or below the arrow, preceded by a plus sign or nothing for a reactant, and by a minus sign for a product. Then the same equation can look like this:

$$\ce{2 CH3OH ->[\overset{}\ce{-H2O}] CH3OCH3}$$

Such notation serves to hide less important substances from the sides of the equation, to make the type of reaction at hand more obvious, and to facilitate chaining of chemical equations. This is very useful in illustrating multi-step reaction mechanisms. Note that the substances above or below the arrows are not catalysts in this case, because they are consumed or produced in the reaction like ordinary reactants or products.

Another extension used in reaction mechanisms moves some substances to branches of the arrow. Both extensions are used in the example illustration of a mechanism.

Use of negative stoichiometric coefficients at either side of the equation (like in the example below) is not widely adopted and is often discouraged.

$$\ce{2 CH3OH \;-\; H2O -> CH3OCH3}$$

== Balancing chemical equations ==
Because no nuclear reactions take place in a chemical reaction, the chemical elements pass through the reaction unchanged. Thus, each side of the chemical equation must represent the same number of atoms of any particular element (or nuclide, if different isotopes are taken into account). The same holds for the total electric charge, as stated by the charge conservation law. An equation adhering to these requirements is said to be balanced.

A chemical equation is balanced by assigning suitable values to the stoichiometric coefficients. Simple equations can be balanced by inspection, that is, by trial and error. Another technique involves solving a system of linear equations.

Balanced equations are usually written with smallest natural-number coefficients. Yet sometimes it may be advantageous to accept a fractional coefficient, if it simplifies the other coefficients. The introductory example can thus be rewritten as

$$\ce{HCl + Na -> NaCl + 1/2 H2}$$

In some circumstances the fractional coefficients are even inevitable. For example, the reaction corresponding to the standard enthalpy of formation must be written such that one molecule of a single product is formed. This will often require that some reactant coefficients be fractional, as is the case with the formation of lithium fluoride:

$$\ce{Li(s) + 1/2F2(g) -> LiF(s)}$$

=== Inspection method ===
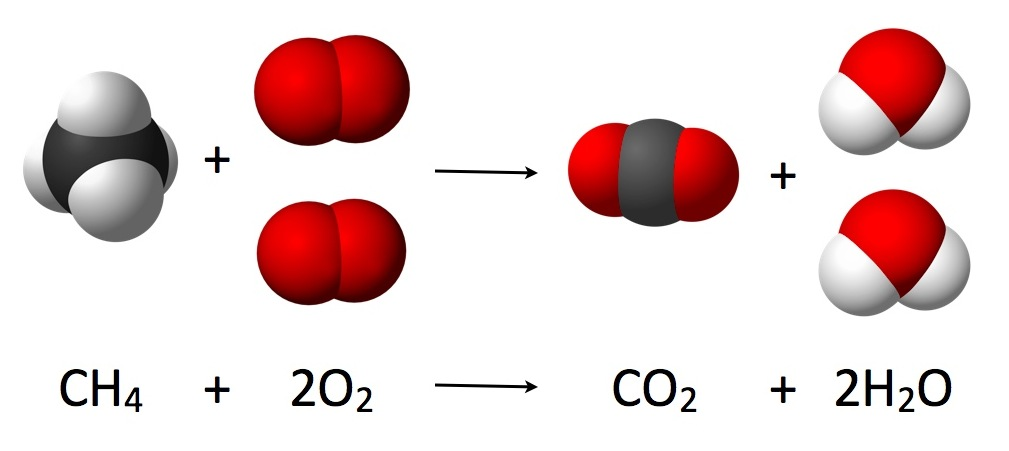
As seen from the equation CH_{4} + 2 O_{2} → CO_{2} + 2 H_{2}O, a coefficient of 2 must be placed before the oxygen gas on the reactants side and before the water on the products side in order for, as per the law of conservation of mass, the quantity of each element does not change during the reaction

P_{4}O_{10} + 6 H_{2}O → 4 H_{3}PO_{4} This chemical equation is being balanced by first multiplying H_{3}PO_{4} by four to match the number of P atoms, and then multiplying H_{2}O by six to match the numbers of H and O atoms.

The method of inspection can be outlined as setting the most complex substance's stoichiometric coefficient to 1 and assigning values to other coefficients step by step such that both sides of the equation end up with the same number of atoms for each element. If any fractional coefficients arise during this process, the presence of fractions may be eliminated (at any time) by multiplying all coefficients by their lowest common denominator.

Example

Balancing of the chemical equation for the complete combustion of methane

$$\ce{\mathord{?}\,{CH4} + \mathord{?}\,{O2} -> \mathord{?}\,{CO2} + \mathord{?}\,{H2O}}$$

is achieved as follows:

1. A coefficient of 1 is placed in front of the most complex formula (CH_{4}):
  $$\ce{1 {CH4} + \mathord{?}\,{O2} -> \mathord{?}\,{CO2} + \mathord{?}\,{H2O}}$$
2. The left-hand side has 1 carbon atom, so 1 molecule of CO_{2} will balance it. The left-hand side also has 4 hydrogen atoms, which will be balanced by 2 molecules of H_{2}O:
  $$\ce{1 {CH4} + \mathord{?}\,{O2} -> 1 {CO2} + 2 H2O}$$
3. Balancing the 4 oxygen atoms of the right-hand side by 2 molecules of O_{2} yields the equation
  $$\ce{1 CH4 + 2 O2 -> 1 CO2 + 2 H2O}$$
4. The coefficients equal to 1 are omitted, as they do not need to be specified explicitly:
  $$\ce{CH4 + 2 O2 -> CO2 + 2 H2O}$$
5. It is wise to check that the final equation is balanced, i.e. that for each element there is the same number of atoms on the left- and right-hand side: 1 carbon, 4 hydrogen, and 4 oxygen.

=== System of linear equations ===
For each chemical element (or nuclide or unchanged moiety or charge) i, its conservation requirement can be expressed by the mathematical equation

$$\sum_{j\,\in\,\text{reactants}} \!\!\!\!\! a_{ij} s_j \ = \!\!\!\!\! \sum_{j\,\in\,\text{products}} \!\!\!\!\! a_{ij} s_j$$

where

a_{ij} is the number of atoms of element i in a molecule of substance j (per formula in the chemical equation), and
s_{j} is the stoichiometric coefficient for the substance j.

This results in a homogeneous system of linear equations, which are readily solved using mathematical methods. Such system always has the all-zeros trivial solution, which we are not interested in, but if there are any additional solutions, there will be infinite number of them. Any non-trivial solution will balance the chemical equation. A "preferred" solution is one with whole-number, mostly positive (Note: A negative stoichiometric coefficient signifies a substance placed on the incorrect side of the chemical equation.) stoichiometric coefficients s_{j} with greatest common divisor equal to one.

==== Example ====
Let us assign variables to stoichiometric coefficients of the chemical equation from the previous section and write the corresponding linear equations:

$$\ce{\mathit{s}_1 {CH4} + \mathit{s}_2 {O2} -> \mathit{s}_3 {CO2} + \mathit{s}_4 {H2O}}$$

$$\quad\;\;\; \begin{align}
\text{C:} && s_1 & = s_3 \\
\text{H:} && 4s_1 & = 2s_4 \\
\text{O:} && 2s_2 & = 2s_3 + s_4
\end{align}$$

All solutions to this system of linear equations are of the following form, where r is any real number:

$$\begin{align}
s_1 & = r \\
s_2 & = 2r \\
s_3 & = r \\
s_4 & = 2r
\end{align}$$

The choice of r = 1 yields the preferred solution,

$$\begin{align}
s_1 & = 1 \\
s_2 & = 2 \\
s_3 & = 1 \\
s_4 & = 2
\end{align}$$

which corresponds to the balanced chemical equation:

$$\ce{CH4 + 2 O2 -> CO2 + 2 H2O}$$

=== Matrix method ===
The system of linear equations introduced in the previous section can also be written using an efficient matrix formalism. First, to unify the reactant and product stoichiometric coefficients s_{j}, let us introduce the quantity

$$\nu_j = \begin{cases} -s_j & \text{for a reactant} \\ +s_j & \text{for a product} \end{cases}$$

called stoichiometric number, (Note: An equivalent approach is flipping the signs of a_{ij} for reactants instead of replacing the stoichiometric coefficients s_{j} with stoichiometric numbers ν_{j}.) which simplifies the linear equations to

$$\sum_{j=1}^J a_{ij} \nu_j=0$$

where J is the total number of reactant and product substances (formulas) in the chemical equation.

Placement of the values a_{ij} at row i and column j of the composition matrix

A =
$$\begin{bmatrix}
a_{1,1} & a_{1,2} & \cdots & a_{1,J} \\
a_{2,1} & a_{2,2} & \cdots & a_{2,J} \\
\vdots  & \vdots  & \ddots & \vdots
\end{bmatrix}$$

and arrangement of the stoichiometric numbers into the stoichiometric vector

ν =
$$\begin{bmatrix} \nu_1 \\ \nu_2 \\ \vdots \\ \nu_J \end{bmatrix}$$

allows the system of equations to be expressed as a single matrix equation:

Aν = 0

Like previously, any nonzero stoichiometric vector ν, which solves the matrix equation, will balance the chemical equation.

The set of solutions to the matrix equation is a linear space called the kernel of the matrix A. For this space to contain nonzero vectors ν, i.e. to have a positive dimension J_{N}, the columns of the composition matrix A must not be linearly independent. The problem of balancing a chemical equation then becomes the problem of determining the J_{N}-dimensional kernel of the composition matrix. Only for J_{N} = 1 will there be a unique preferred solution to the balancing problem. For J_{N} > 1 there will be an infinite number of preferred solutions with J_{N} of them linearly independent. If J_{N} = 0, there will be only the unusable trivial solution, the zero vector.

Techniques have been developed to quickly calculate a set of J_{N} independent solutions to the balancing problem, which are superior to the inspection and algebraic method in that they are determinative and yield all solutions to the balancing problem.

Example

Using the same chemical equation again, write the corresponding matrix equation:

$$\ce{\mathit{s}_1 {CH4} + \mathit{s}_2 {O2} -> \mathit{s}_3 {CO2} + \mathit{s}_4 {H2O}}$$
$$\begin{matrix} \text{C:} \\ \text{H:} \\ \text{O:} \end{matrix} \quad \begin{bmatrix}
1 & 0 & 1 & 0 \\
4 & 0 & 0 & 2 \\
0 & 2 & 2 & 1
\end{bmatrix} \begin{bmatrix} \nu_1 \\ \nu_2 \\ \nu_3 \\ \nu_4 \end{bmatrix} = \mathbf{0}$$

Its solutions are of the following form, where r is any real number:

$$\begin{bmatrix} \nu_1 \\ \nu_2 \\ \nu_3 \\ \nu_4 \end{bmatrix} = \begin{bmatrix} -s_1 \\ -s_2 \\ s_3 \\ s_4 \end{bmatrix} = r \begin{bmatrix} -1 \\ -2 \\ 1 \\ 2 \end{bmatrix}$$

The choice of r = 1 and a sign-flip of the first two rows yields the preferred solution to the balancing problem:

$$\begin{bmatrix} -\nu_1 \\ -\nu_2 \\ \nu_3 \\ \nu_4 \end{bmatrix} = \begin{bmatrix} s_1 \\ s_2 \\ s_3 \\ s_4 \end{bmatrix} = \begin{bmatrix} 1 \\ 2 \\ 1 \\ 2 \end{bmatrix}$$

== Ionic equations ==
An ionic equation is a chemical equation in which electrolytes are written as dissociated ions. Ionic equations are used for single and double displacement reactions that occur in aqueous solutions.

For example, in the following precipitation reaction:

$$\ce{CaCl2 + 2AgNO3 -> Ca(NO3)2 + 2 AgCl(v)}$$

the full ionic equation is:

$$\ce{Ca^2+ + 2Cl^- + 2Ag+ + 2NO3^- -> Ca^2+ + 2NO3^- + 2AgCl(v)}$$

or, with all physical states included:

$$\ce{Ca^2+(aq) + 2Cl^{-}(aq) + 2Ag+(aq) + 2NO3^{-}(aq) -> Ca^2+(aq) + 2NO3^{-}(aq) + 2AgCl(v)}$$

In this reaction, the Ca^{2+} and the NO_{3}^{−} ions remain in solution and are not part of the reaction. That is, these ions are identical on both the reactant and product side of the chemical equation. Because such ions do not participate in the reaction, they are called spectator ions. A net ionic equation is the full ionic equation from which the spectator ions have been removed. The net ionic equation of the proceeding reactions is:

$$\ce{2Cl^- + 2Ag+ -> 2AgCl(v)}$$

or, in reduced balanced form,

$$\ce{Ag+ + Cl^- -> AgCl(v)}$$

In a neutralization or acid/base reaction, the net ionic equation will usually be:

$$\ce{H+ (aq) + OH^{-}(aq) -> H2O(l)}$$

Some acid/base reactions produce a precipitate in addition to the water molecule shown above. An example is the reaction of barium hydroxide with phosphoric acid, which produces not only water but also the insoluble salt barium phosphate. In this reaction, there are no spectator ions, so the net ionic equation is the same as the full ionic equation.

$$\ce{3Ba(OH)2 + 2H3PO4 -> 6H2O + Ba3(PO4)2(v)}$$
$$\ce{{3Ba^2+} + {6OH^-} + {6H+}} + \underbrace\ce{2PO4^3-}_\ce{phosphate} \ce{-> {6H2O} + \underbrace{Ba3(PO4)2(v)}_{barium~phosphate}}$$

Double displacement reactions that feature a carbonate reacting with an acid have the net ionic equation:

$$\ce{2H+} + \underbrace\ce{CO3^2-}_\ce{carbonate} \ce{-> H2O + CO2 (^)}$$

If every ion is a "spectator ion" then there was no reaction, and the net ionic equation is null.

Generally, if z_{j} is the multiple of elementary charge on the j-th molecule, charge neutrality may be written as:

$$\sum_{j=1}^J z_j \nu_j=0$$

where the ν_{j} are the stoichiometric coefficients described above. The z_{j} may be incorporated as an additional row in the a_{ij} matrix described above, and a properly balanced ionic equation will then also obey:

$$\sum_{j=1}^J a_{ij} \nu_j=0$$

== Oxidation-reduction (redox) equations ==
Redox reactions involve a complete or partial transfer of electrons from one molecular or ionic species to another. The species which receives the transferred electron(s) is known as the oxidant and undergoes reduction. The species which provides the electron(s) is known as the reductant and undergoes oxidation.

Oxidation-reduction equations may be balanced by a method which involves determining the numbers of electrons gained in the reduction and lost in the oxidation, and then choosing coefficients which make the total number of electrons gained equal the number of electrons lost.

== History ==
Before many elements had a standardized symbol or were even officially discovered, in the late 18th century Torbern Bergman noted the combination of two substances as A + B to become AB.

== See also ==
- Mathematical notation
- Comparison of TeX editors
- TeX extensions for science and chemistry notation
- Chemistry notation in TeX
