= Spectator ion =

Type of ion in aqueous solutions

A spectator ion is an ion that exists both as a reactant and a product in a chemical equation of an aqueous solution.

For example, in the reaction of aqueous solutions of sodium carbonate and copper(II) sulfate:

2 Na^{+}_{(aq)} + CO^{2−}_{3}_{(aq)} + Cu^{2+}_{(aq)} + SO^{2−}_{4}_{(aq)} → 2 Na^{+}_{(aq)} + SO^{2−}_{4}_{(aq)} + CuCO_{3}_{(s)}

The Na^{+} and SO^{2−}_{4} ions are spectator ions since they remain unchanged on both sides of the equation. They simply "watch" the other ions react and does not participate in any reaction, hence the name. They are present in total ionic equations to balance the charges of the ions. Whereas the Cu^{2+} and CO^{2−}_{3} ions combine to form a precipitate of solid CuCO_{3}. In reaction stoichiometry, spectator ions are removed from a complete ionic equation to form a net ionic equation. For the above example this yields:

So: ~~2 Na^{+}_{(aq)}~~ + CO^{2−}_{3}_{(aq)} + Cu^{2+}_{(aq)} + ~~SO^{2−}_{4}_{(aq)}~~ → ~~2 Na^{+}_{(aq)}~~ + ~~SO^{2−}_{4}_{(aq)}~~ + CuCO_{3}_{(s)} (where ~~x~~ = spectator ion)

⇒ CO^{2−}_{3}_{(aq)} + Cu^{2+}_{(aq)} → CuCO_{3}_{(s)}

Spectator ion concentration only affects the Debye length. In contrast, potential determining ions, whose concentrations affect surface potential (by surface chemical reactions) as well the Debye length.

== Net ionic equation ==
A net ionic equation ignores the spectator ions that were part of the original equation. So, the net ionic equation only shows the ions which reacted to produce a precipitate. Therefore, the total ionic reaction is different from the net reaction.

== See also ==
- Catalysis
