= Jean Beguin =

Jean Beguin (1550–1620) was an iatrochemist noted for his 1610 Tyrocinium Chymicum (Begin Chemistry), which many consider to be one of the first chemistry textbooks. In the 1615 edition of his textbook, Beguin made the first-ever chemical equation or rudimentary reaction diagrams, showing the results of reactions in which there are two or more reagents. Modern rendering of this famous diagram, detailing the reaction of corrosive sublimate (HgCl_{2}) with sulfide of antimony (Sb_{2}S_{3}), is shown below:

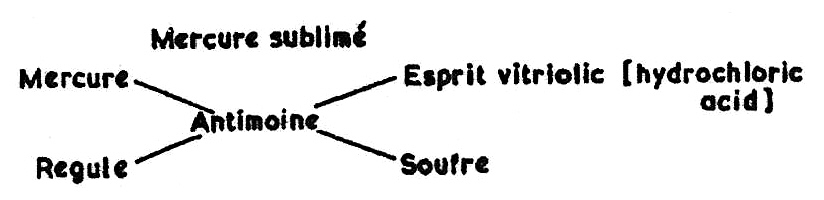
Beguin's 1615 reaction diagram, the first-ever chemical equation.

A article talking about the diagram above:https://www.robertopoetichimica.it/en/download/jean-beguins-first-chemical-equation/

The actual book pdf the article talks about:https://archive.org/details/hin-wel-all-00001825-001/page/n196

== See also ==
- Timeline of chemistry
