= Single displacement reaction =

Type of chemical reaction

A single-displacement reaction, also known as single replacement reaction or exchange reaction, is a type of chemical reaction in which one element or ligand is replaced by an atom or group.

It can be represented generically as:

$$\ce{A + BC -> AC + B}$$

where either

- $\ce{A}$ and $\ce{B}$ are different metals (or any element that forms cation like hydrogen) and $\ce{C}$ is an anion; or
- $\ce{A}$ and $\ce{B}$ are halogens and $\ce{C}$ is a cation.

This will most often occur if $\ce{A}$ is more reactive than $\ce{B}$, thus giving a more stable product. The reaction in that case is exergonic and spontaneous.

In the first case, when $\ce{A}$ and $\ce{B}$ are metals, $\ce{BC}$ and $\ce{AC}$ are usually aqueous compounds (or very rarely in a molten state) and $\ce{C}$ is a spectator ion (i.e. remains unchanged).

$$\ce{A(s) + \underbrace{B+(aq) +  C^{-}(aq)}_{BC(aq)} -> \underbrace{A+(aq) + C^{-}(aq)}_{AC(aq)} + B(s)}$$

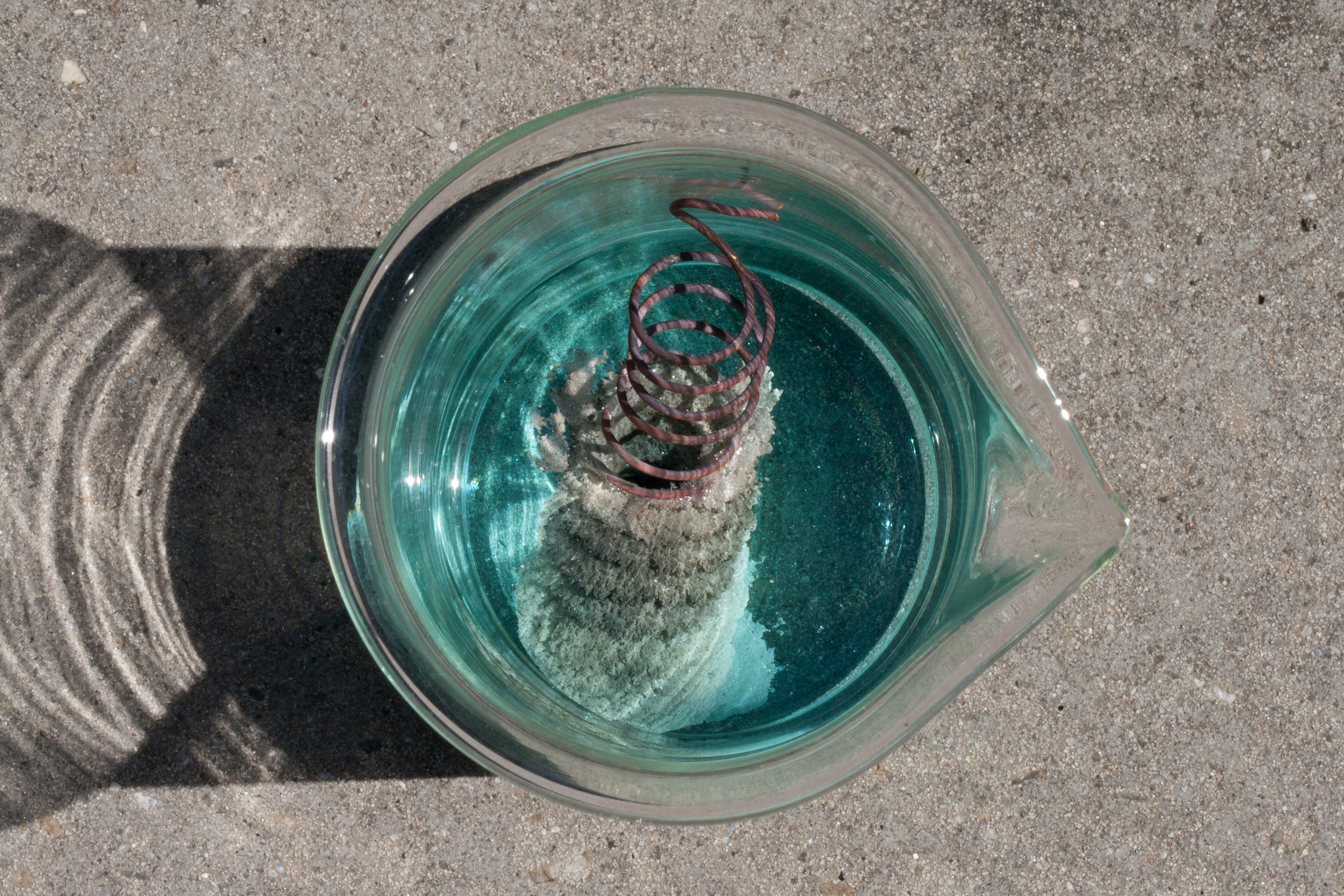
When a copper wire is dipped in a silver nitrate solution, copper displaces silver, turning the solution blue and solid silver precipitates out ("silver tree"): Cu + AgNO₃ → Cu(NO₃)₂ + Ag↓

NCSSM video on single displacement reaction

Formation of tin crystals as zinc displaces tin, seen under microscope.

In the reactivity series, the metals with the highest propensity to donate their electrons to react are listed first, followed by less reactive ones. Therefore, a metal higher on the list can displace anything below it. Here is a condensed version of the same:

$$\ce{K} > \ce{Na} > \ce{Ca} > \ce{Mg} > \ce{Al} > {\color{gray}\ce{C}} > \ce{Zn} > \ce{Fe} > {\color{gray}\ce{NH4^+}} > {\color{gray}\ce{H+}} > \ce{Cu} > \ce{Ag} > \ce{Au}$$
(Hydrogen, carbon and ammonium — labeled in gray — are not metals.)

Similarly, the halogens with the highest propensity to acquire electrons are the most reactive. The activity series for halogens is:

$$\ce{F2>Cl2>Br2>I2}$$

Due to the free state nature of $\ce{A}$ and $\ce{B}$, single displacement reactions are also redox reactions, involving the transfer of electrons from one reactant to another. When $\ce{A}$ and $\ce{B}$ are metals, $\ce{A}$ is always oxidized and $\ce{B}$ is always reduced. Since halogens prefer to gain electrons, $\ce{A}$ is reduced (from $\ce{0}$ to $\ce{-1}$) and $\ce{B}$ is oxidized (from $\ce{-1}$ to $\ce{0}$).

== Cation replacement ==
Here one cation replaces another:

$$\ce{A + BC -> AC + B}$$

(Element A has replaced B in compound BC to become a new compound AC and the free element B.)

Some examples are:

$\ce{Fe + CuSO4 -> FeSO4 + Cu}$

(Blue vitriol)____(Green vitriol)

$\ce{Zn + CuSO4 -> ZnSO4 + Cu}$

(Blue vitriol)___(White vitriol)

$\ce{Zn + FeSO4 -> ZnSO4 + Fe}$

(Green vitriol) (White vitriol)

These reactions are exothermic and the rise in temperature is usually in the order of the reactivity of the different metals.

If the reactant in elemental form is not the more reactive metal, then no reaction will occur. Some examples of this would be the reverse.

$\ce{Fe + ZnSO4 ->}$ No Reaction

External videos
- CuCl_{2} and Iron Part 2, 2011
- Reaction of CuCl_{2} with Al, 2011
- Copper Sulfate and Iron: Part 1, 2011

== Anion replacement ==
Here one anion replaces another:

$$\ce{A + CB -> CA + B}$$

(Element A has replaced B in the compound CB to form a new compound CA and the free element B.)

Some examples are:

$\ce{Cl2 + 2NaBr -> 2NaCl + Br2}$

$\ce{Br2 + 2KI -> 2KBr + I2(v)}$

$\ce{Cl2 + H2S -> 2HCl + S(v)}$

Again, the less reactive halogen cannot replace the more reactive halogen:

$\ce{I2 + 2KBr ->}$ no reaction

== Common reactions ==
=== Metal-acid reaction ===
Metals react with acids to form salts and hydrogen gas.

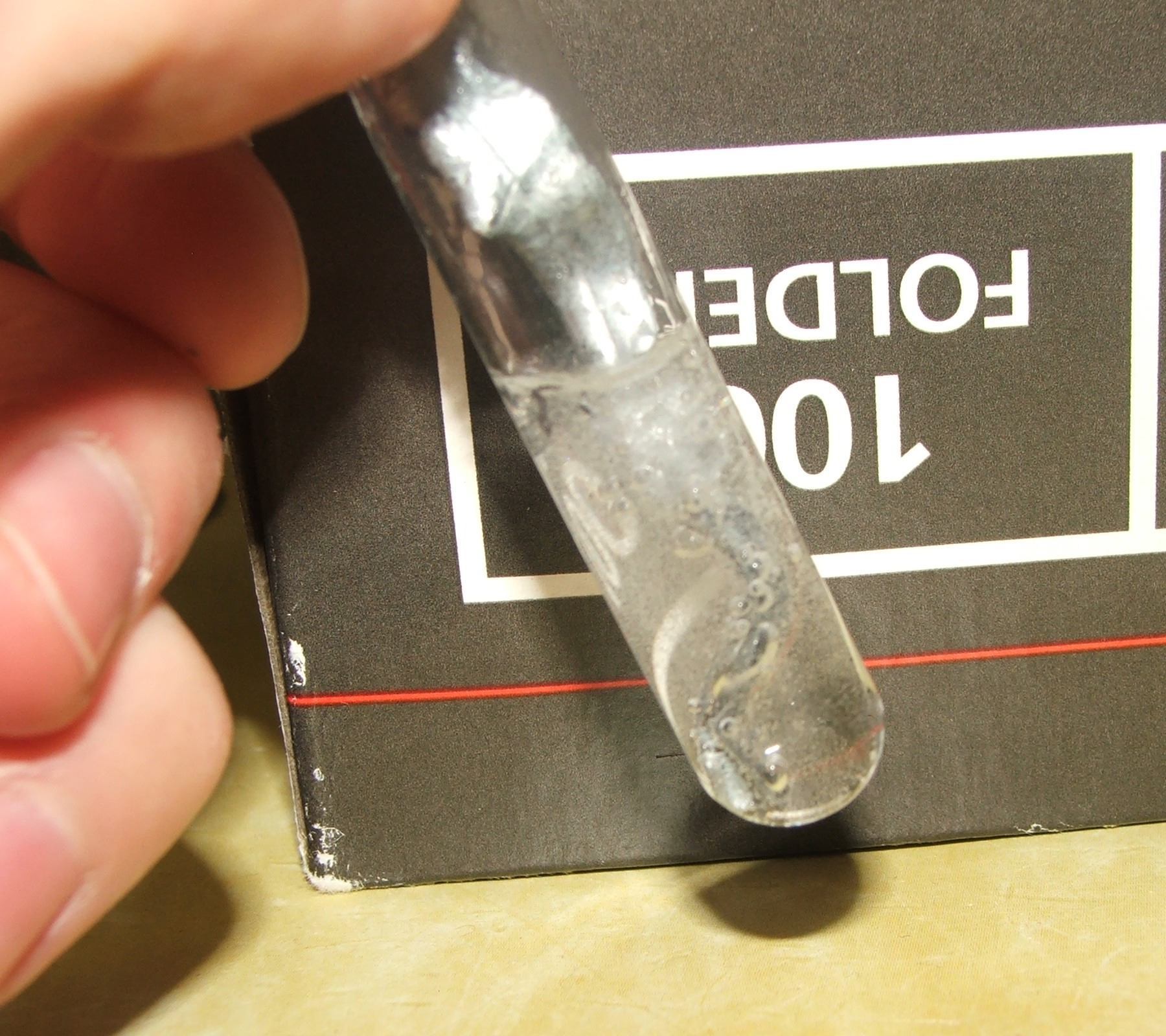
Liberation of hydrogen gas when zinc reacts with hydrochloric acid.

$\ce{Zn(s) + 2HCl(aq) -> ZnCl2(aq) + H2 ^}$

However, less reactive metals cannot displace the hydrogen from acids. (They may react with oxidizing acids though.)

$\ce{Cu + HCl ->}$ No reaction

=== Reaction between metal and water ===
Metals react with water to form metal oxides and hydrogen gas. The metal oxides further dissolve in water to form alkalies.

$$\ce{Fe(s) + H2O (g) -> FeO(s) + H2 ^}$$

$$\ce{Ca(s) + 2H2O (l) -> Ca(OH)2(aq) + H2 ^}$$

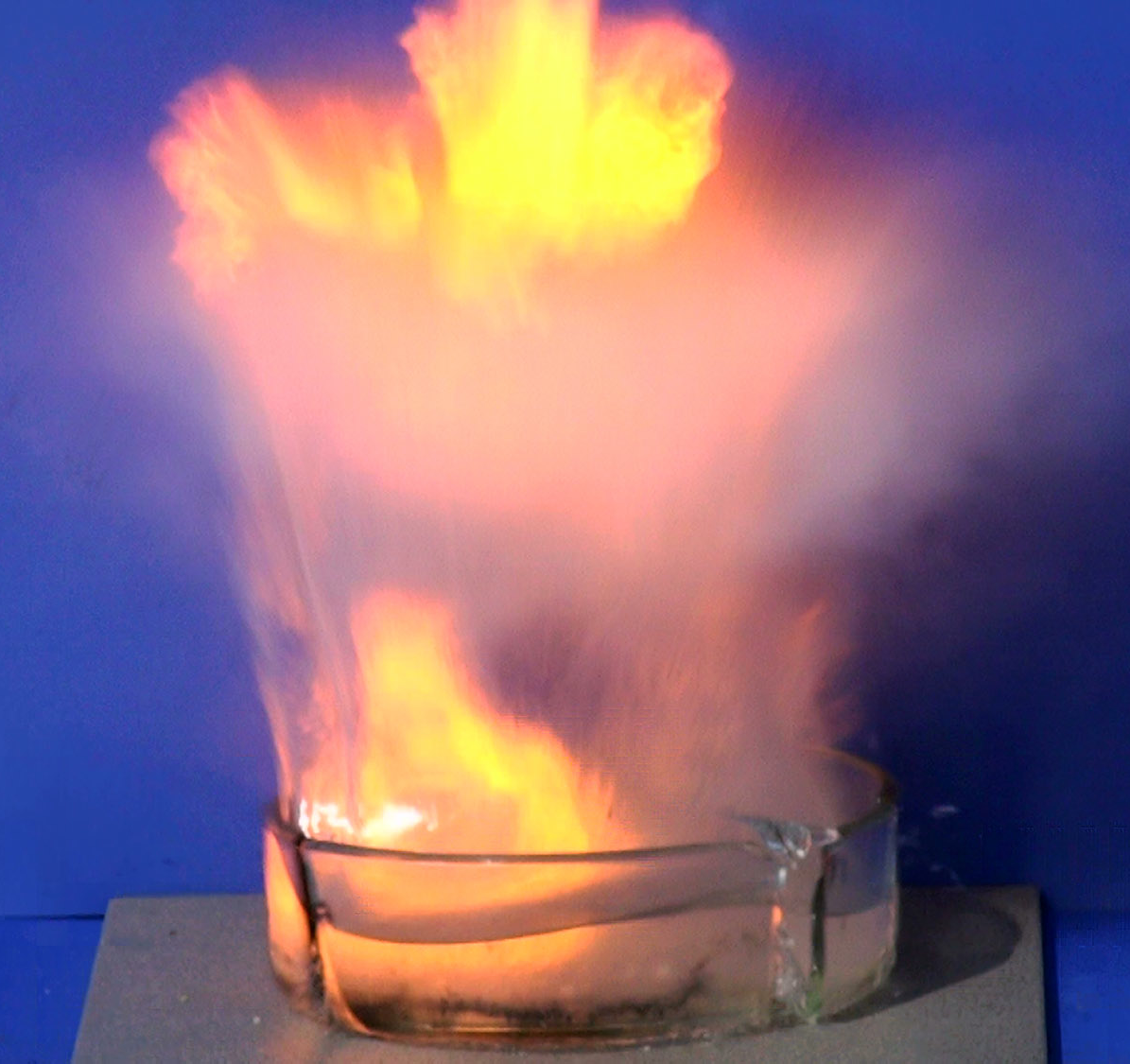
Explosive reaction of sodium in water, shattering the glass vessel.

The reaction can be extremely violent with alkali metals as the hydrogen gas catches fire.

Metals like gold and silver, which are below hydrogen in the reactivity series, do not react with water.

External videos
- Reaction of Potassium and Water, 2011
- Reaction of Magnesium and Water, 2011

=== Metal extraction ===
Coke or more reactive metals are used to reduce metals by carbon from their metal oxides, such as in the carbothermic reaction of zinc oxide (zincite) to produce zinc metal:

$$\ce{ZnO + C -> Zn + CO}$$

and the use of aluminium to produce manganese from manganese dioxide:

$$\ce{3MnO2 + 4Al -> 3Mn + 2Al2O3}$$

Such reactions are also used in extraction of boron, silicon, titanium and tungsten.

$$\ce{3SiO2 + 4Al -> 3Si + 2Al2O3}$$
$$\ce{B2O3 + 3Mg -> 2B + 3MgO}$$
$$\ce{TiCl4 + 2Mg -> Ti + 2MgCl2}$$
$$\ce{WF6 + 3 H2 -> W + 6 HF}$$

=== Thermite reaction ===
Using highly reactive metals as reducing agents leads to exothermic reactions that melt the metal produced. This is used for welding railway tracks.

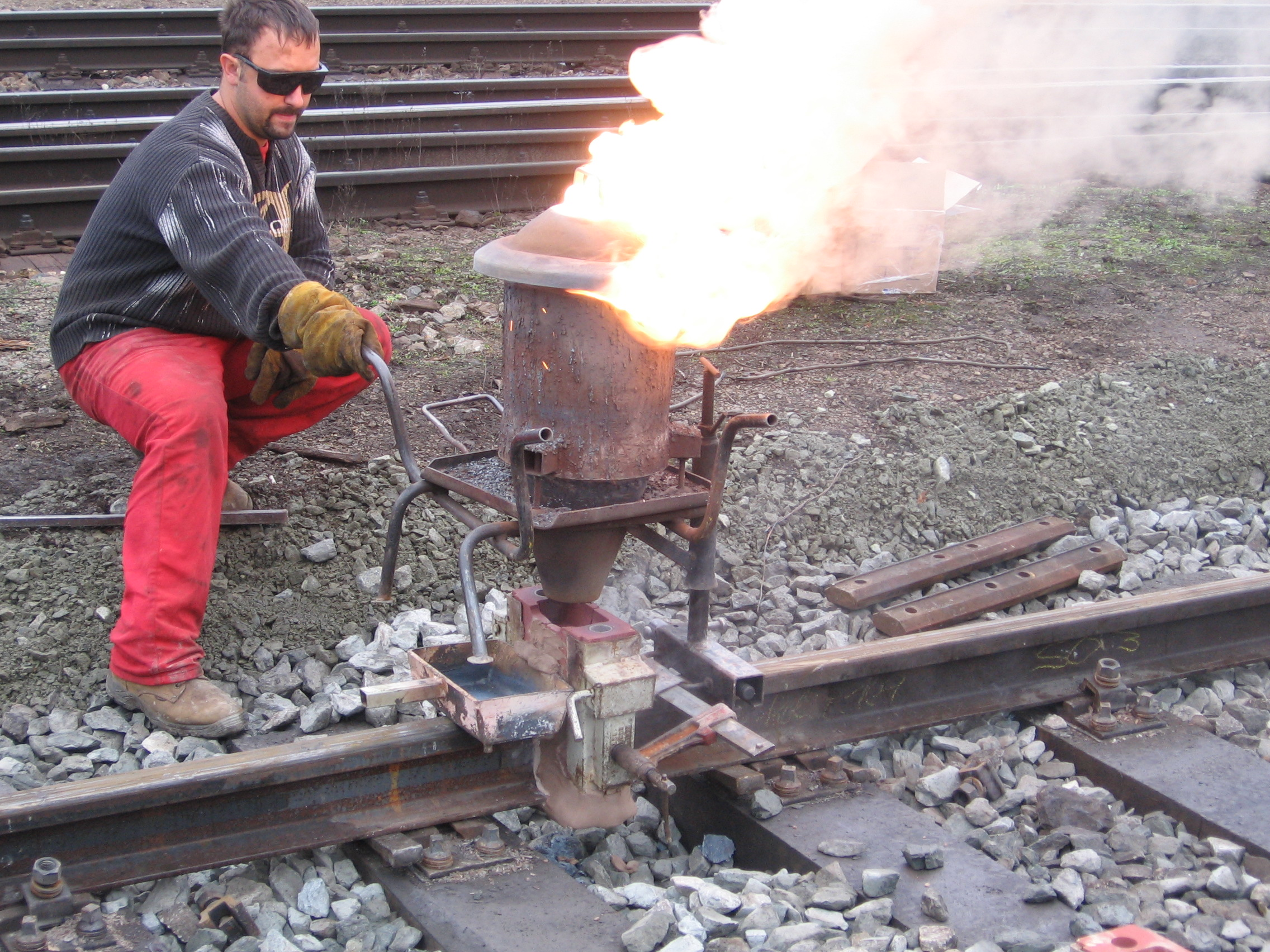
Thermite reaction proceeding for a railway welding: Shortly after this, the liquid iron flows into the mould around the rail gap

$$\ce{Fe2O3(s) + 2 Al(s) -> 2 Fe(l) + Al2O3(s)}$$

a(Haematite)

$$\ce{3CuO + 2Al -> 3Cu + Al2O3}$$

=== Silver tarnish ===
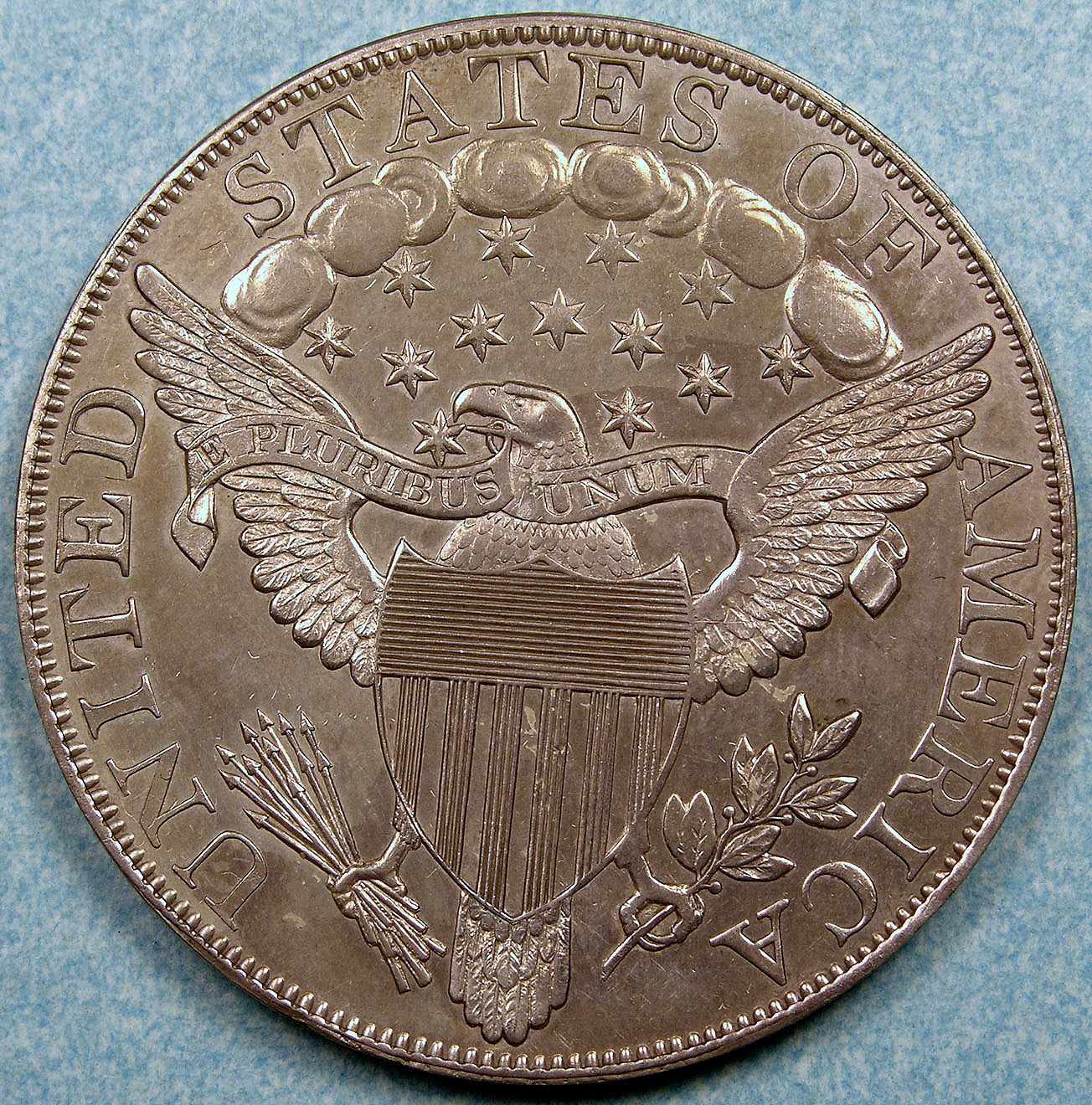
A tarnished silver coin

Silver tarnishes due to the presence of hydrogen sulfide, leading to formation of silver sulfide.

$$\ce{4Ag + 2H2S + O2 -> 2Ag2S + 2H2O}$$

$$\ce{3Ag2S + 2Al -> 6Ag + Al2S3}$$

=== Extraction of halogens ===
Chlorine is manufactured industrially by the Deacon's process. The reaction takes place at about 400 to 450 °C in the presence of a variety of catalysts such as $\ce{CuCl2}$.

$$\ce{4HCl + O2 -> 2 Cl2 + 2H2O}$$

Bromine and iodine are extracted from brine by displacing with chlorine.

$$\ce{2HBr + Cl2 -> 2HCl + Br2 ^}$$

$$\ce{2HI + Cl2 -> 2HCl + I2 ^}$$

== See also ==
- Double-displacement reaction
- Decomposition reaction
- Combination reaction
- Substitution reaction
