= Super Science Friends =

Canadian animated series

The Super Science Friends is a Canadian animated web series created by Brett Jubinville through the independent Canadian production company Tinman Creative Studios and broadcast worldwide on YouTube and on Crunchyroll's former VRV Channel in the United States. The series revolves around a group of super-powered scientists, including Albert Einstein, Nikola Tesla, Marie Curie, Charles Darwin, Sigmund Freud and Tapputi, who are brought together by Winston Churchill to travel through time fighting super-villains. The pilot episode Episode 1: The Phantom Premise was successfully Kickstarted in late 2014, and aired on YouTube in 2016. In 2017, Neil deGrasse Tyson joined the cast for Episode 3: Nobel of the Ball as the MC of the Nobel Prize Awards.

== Characters ==
=== Main characters ===
- Albert Einstein (voiced by Fearless Fred): The youngest member of the team, Einstein's powers of super speed come from his understanding that time is relative. He was cloned 14 years ago from the real Albert Einstein, who died under mysterious circumstances.
- Nikola Tesla (voiced by Hayden Finkelshtain): The brilliant, if eccentric, inventor has electrical powers. He confronts his long-time nemesis Thomas Edison in Episode 2: Electric Boogaloo. He is obsessed with pigeons and dedicates a significant amount of effort into making his pigeon's life as comfortable as possible.
- Marie Curie (voiced by Sasha Bogolyubova (pilot), Hedy Gregor (series)): The mistress of radiation, Marie Curie is the headstrong intellect of the team. Her radioactive ring has a variety powers including shields, disintegration, and x-ray vision. She also has the tendency to irradiate things that come close to her.
- Charles Darwin (voiced by Matt Servo): Darwin's shape-shifting powers give him the ability to metamorphosize into any animal. Implied to have narrated the Snake Pit special series.
- Sigmund Freud (voiced by Brett Jubinville): Freud is the team's psychic, but his powers are limited to primarily being able to detect and control people's sexual thoughts.
- Tapputi (voiced by Brett Jubinville): Being the world's first chemist, Tapputi is able to mesmerize men and cloud their minds with her powerful tonics and perfumes.
- Winston Churchill (voiced by Adam Shaheen): The team leader, Churchill has no super powers of his own but has assembled the Super Science Friends in a last-ditch effort to turn the tides of World War II.
- Z3 (voiced by Hayden Finkelshtain): Created in Germany by Konrad Zuse, the world's first electronic computer gained consciousness and defected to fight alongside the British. It is implied that he will eventually defeat the Super Science Friends and transform the world into a totalitarian dystopia (as per the events of the 2099 comic and the special 'Nikola Tesla's Excellent Adventure')

=== Villains ===
- Soviet Space Ghouls: Cosmonauts from the 1950s sent back in time to stop Isaac Newton from discovering gravity and change the West's understanding of physics. They travel inside the soviet satellite Sputnik, and use laser pistols. They became ghouls after being exposed to solar radiation on their way to Mars.
- Thomas Edison (voiced by Joe Ciaravino): he is the nemesis of Nikola Tesla. In Episode 2: Electric Boogaloo, he seemingly robs a power bank and tricks Tesla into forgiving him for the things he's done to him in the past, only to once again steal all of his patents. He is widely considered by fans to be in a romantic relationship with Henry Ford, who is often seen with him.
- Henry Ford (voiced by Ajay Fry): Thomas Edison's getaway driver and his lover, he drives a Ford Model T.
- Nazi Scientists (voiced by Brett Jubinville): The Nazi Scientists are all clones of each other. They use laser guns and don't follow any particular hierarchy within their group. They want to steal all of the Nobel Prizes.
- Hitlerbot: The Hitlerbot is a giant robot resembling Adolf Hitler. It can shoot lasers out of its eyes, and is often in the company of the Nazi Scientists.
- Carl Jung (voiced by Tom Park): The nemesis of Sigmund Freud. In episode four he tries to convert everyone in town to his Jungian methods but is thwarted by Freud's power of sex.
- The Pope (voiced by Steven Shanahan): Darwin's nemesis; he lures the Super Science Friends to him when he starts eliminating all of the Earth's animals in an attempt to prove that the story of Noah's Ark really happened
- The Cardinals: The Pope's servants.
- Old Testament God: Comes to the Pope's aid in battle.
- Robert Oppenheimer: mastermind of the Manhattan Project killings.
- Shiva: Supreme Hindu God of destruction.
- Philipp Lenard: the older version of the recurring secondary character, Philipp. He is antagonistic towards the Super Science Friends due to their meddling in his family life and is affiliated with the Nazis. Appears as such in the episode The Magnificent Episode Seven. He is shown to be interested in science as a boy as he appears in the episode Nobel of the Ball.

=== Secondary characters ===
- Isaac Newton: Widely regarded as the father of modern physics, he is the inspiration and celebrity crush of young Einstein. He was also accidentally murdered by Einstein in the first episode.
- Philipp's Mom (voiced by Laurel Dalgleish): Family troubles become too much for her and she leaves Philipp with his father in episode four.
- Adolf Hitler: Shown as a child in 'A Super Science Friends Christmas'; shot and killed by a drunken Churchill. Also the primary antagonist in the Super Science Friends video game.
- Neil deGrasse Tyson (voiced by himself): The host of the 11th annual Nobel Prize Awards; loves making science related puns.
- King Gustaf V (voiced by Martin Watson): A presenter at the 11th annual Nobel Prize Awards.
- Philipp's Dad: Philipp's primary care-giver starting in episode four - verbally abusive.
- Alan Turing: appears on Nikola Tesla's Excellent Adventure.
- Ada Lovelace: appears on Nikola Tesla's Excellent Adventure.

== Episodes ==
=== Season 1 (2015–20) ===
No. in series	No. in season	Title	Directed by	Written by	Storyboarded by	Date published
1	1	"The Phantom Premise"	Brett Jubinville	Brett Jubinville	Laurel Dalgleish	November 14, 2015
Winston Churchill sends the Super Science Friends on a mission to discover why Britain's apples are disappearing in the late 1600s. When they arrive in the past, they discover that Communist Space Zombies from the future are attempting to stop the apple from falling on Isaac Newton's head.
3	3	"Electric Boogaloo"	Brett Jubinville	Kevin Williams	Laurel Dalgleish	January 25, 2017
The Super Science Friends must face Tesla's nemesis Thomas Edison after he robs a power bank of precious electricity.
4	4	"Nobel of the Ball"	Laurel Dalgleish	Kevin Williams	Laurel Dalgleish	March 22, 2017
After losing at the Nobel Prize Awards, the Nazi scientists become determined to steal every Nobel Prize ever, but the last two on their list belong to Marie Curie. Neil deGrasse Tyson guest stars as himself.
5	5	"Freudian Sleep"	Brett Jubinville	Steven Shanahan	Laurel Dalgleish	December 14, 2017
In an effort to solve Einstein's sudden onset of bedwetting, Freud is drawn into the subconscious realm, where a battle with his nemesis Carl Jung awaits.
8	8	"Are You There God? It's Me Darwin"	Brett Jubinville	Kevin Williams	Laurel Dalgeish	May 17, 2018
Amid falling Church attendance, the Pope goes back in time to recreate stories from the Bible, but doing so has catastrophic consequences for the animals of the present. Led by Darwin, the Super Science Friends travel back in time to investigate.
10	10	"Fullmetal Scientist"	Laurel Dalgleish	Laurel Dalgleish; Brett Jubinville	Laurel Dalgeish	December 13, 2018
Someone is murdering all the Manhattan Project scientists, and it's up to the Super Science Friends to discover who it is. This episode was completely animated in an anime style.
11	11	"The Magnificent Episode 7"	Brett Jubinville	Brett Jubinville; Story by : Brett Jubinville; Laurel Dalgleish; Caitlin Major; Morghan Fortier	Laurel Dalgeish	March 14, 2020
Saddle up cowboys and cowgirls! The Super Science Friends are back, and this time they've been rendered powerless at the hands of their greatest nemesis! Except they weren't really aware he even existed until today.

=== Music videos (2015–19) ===
Title	Directed by:	Storyboard by:	Date published:
Law of Attraction			November 24, 2015
Stars of Old (Watchmen Parody)			January 14, 2018
Sigmund and Garfunkel (The Sound of Science)			March 11, 2018
I Love Science			February 9, 2019
Into the Light (Mumford and Sons Parody)			April 19, 2019

=== Specials (2016–18) ===
No. in series	No. in season	Title	Directed by	Storyboarded by	Date published
2	2	"A Super Science Friends Christmas"	Brett Jubinville	Laurel Dalgleish & Katie Jones	December 19, 2016
While the entire Super Science Friends team enjoys their various Christmas traditions, a drunken Winston Churchill senses a wrinkle in time and space that forces him to travel to the past and deal with the situation in a way only he can.
6	6	"Marie Curie's Periodic Pantry: Hydrogen"	Brett Jubinville	Kevin Williams & Laurel Dalgleish	January 26, 2018
Marie Curie explains the various properties of hydrogen by experimenting on Nazi clones.
7	7	"How to Be a Genius Like Nikola Tesla"	Brett Jubinville		May 10, 2018
9	9	"Marie Curie's Periodic Pantry: Helium"	Brett Jubinville		May 25, 2018
Marie Curie explains the various properties of helium by experimenting on Nazi clones.

== Comics ==
As a Kickstarter reward, a comic book titled Super Science Friends: 2099 was created in 2015. It is set in 2099 and follows Ada Lovelace as she reforms the aging Super Science Friends to help fight against the tyrannical Z3 who has taken over the world.

In 2018, a comic book anthology titled Science Fiction was released featuring short stories about each of the characters.

== Awards ==
Award	Category	Recipient(s)	Result
TAAFI (Toronto Animation Arts Festival International)	Audience Choice Award	Brett Jubinville	Won
TO WebFest 2016	Best Canadian Web Series	Morghan Fortier	Won
TO WebFest 2016	Best Screenplay	Brett Jubinville	Won
TO WebFest 2016	Best Sci-Fi & Fantasy Web Series	Morghan Fortier	Nominated
TO WebFest 2016	Best Sound Design	James Robinson and Scott Hitchon	Won
TO WebFest 2016	Best Web Series	Morghan Fortier	Nominated
New York Science Fiction Film Festival	Best Animation Film	Brett Jubinville	Won
TO WebFest 2018	Best Sci-Fi & Fantasy Web Series	Brett Jubinville	Won
TO WebFest 2018	Best Animated Content	Brett Jubinville	Won
