= Oxidizing acid =

Brønsted acid

An oxidizing acid is a Brønsted acid that is also a strong oxidizing agent. Most Brønsted acids can act as oxidizing agents to some degree, because the acidic proton can be reduced to hydrogen gas, but oxidizing acids contain additional structures that act as stronger oxidizing agents than hydrogen ions. These acids contain highly electronegative atoms (like oxygen or halogens) that can accept electrons. Generally, they contain oxygen in their anionic structure. Oxidizing acids include nitric acid, perchloric acid, chloric acid, chromic acid, and concentrated sulfuric acid.

== General properties ==
Oxidizing acids, being strong oxidizing agents, can often oxidize certain less-reactive metals, in which the active oxidizing agent is not H^{+} ions. For example, copper is a rather unreactive metal, and has no reaction with concentrated hydrochloric acid. However, even dilute nitric acid can oxidize copper to Cu^{2+} ions, with the nitrate ions acting as the effective oxidant:

3 Cu + 8 HNO_{3} → 3 Cu^{2+} + 2 NO + 4 H_{2}O + 6 NO^{−}_{3}

Sometimes the concentration of the acid is a factor for it to be strongly oxidizing. Again, copper has no reaction with dilute sulfuric acid, but in concentrated sulfuric acid, the highly acidic environment and high concentration of sulfate ions allow the sulfate ions to act as an oxidizing agent. Sulfuric acid is not an oxidizing agent, but the sulfate ion is a very weak oxidizing agent. Since sulfur is in its maximum oxidation state in the sulfate ion, it cannot act as a reducing agent.

Cu + 2 H_{2}SO_{4} → SO_{2} + 2 H_{2}O + SO^{2−}_{4} + Cu^{2+}

== Uses of oxidizing acids ==
1. Dissolving less reactive/noble metals (like Cu, Ag, Au, Pt) that do not react with non-oxidizing acids like HCl.
2. Strong oxidizing reactions in inorganic chemistry and organic chemistry.
3. Cleaning and etching metals (electronics, microfabrication).
4. Nitration and sulfonation reactions (important in explosives, dyes, and pharmaceuticals).
5. Analytical chemistry—digestion of samples, preparation of solutions for spectroscopy.

== See also ==
- Reduction potential
- Standard electrode potential (data page)
