= Verbalisation =

Verbalisation (or verbalization, see spelling differences) is a process by which different psychological events in an individual are made in verbal form, i.e. described "in their own words". According to psychoanalytic concepts, only when clients manage to verbalise their own experiences or problems is it possible to understand subconscious phenomena, i.e. alterations in personality, which leads to improvement.
