= Potential determining ion =

When placed into solution, salts begin to dissolve and form ions. This is not always in equal proportion, due to the preference of an ion to be dissolved in a given solution. The ability of an ion to preferentially dissolve (as a result of unequal activities) over its counterion is classified as the potential determining ion. The properties of this ion are strongly related to the surface potential present on a corresponding solid.

This unequal property between corresponding ions results in a net surface charge. In some cases this arises because one of the ions freely leaves a corresponding solid and the other does not or it is bound to the solid by some other means. Adsorption of an ion to the solid may result in the solid acting as an electrode. (e.g., H^{+} and OH^{−} on the surfaces of clays).

In a colloidal dispersed system, ion dissolution arises, where the dispersed particles exist in equilibrium with their saturated counterpart, for example:

NaCl_{(s)} ⇌ Na^{+}_{(aq)} + Cl^{−}_{(aq)}

The behavior of this system is characterised by the components activity coefficients and solubility product:

a_{Na^{+}} · a_{Cl^{−}} = K_{sp}

In clay-aqueous systems the potential of the surface is determined by the activity of ions which react with the mineral surface. Frequently this is the hydrogen ion H^{+} in which case the important activity is determined by pH.

The simultaneous adsorption of protons and hydroxyls as well as other potential determining cations and anions, leads to the concept of point of zero charge or PZC, where the total charge from the cations and anions at the surface is equal to zero.

The charge must be zero, and this does not necessarily mean the number of cations versus anions in the solution are equal. For clay minerals the potential determining ions are H^{+} and OH^{−} and complex ions formed by bonding with H^{+} and OH^{−}.
