= Tyrocinium Chymicum =

Book by Jean Beguin

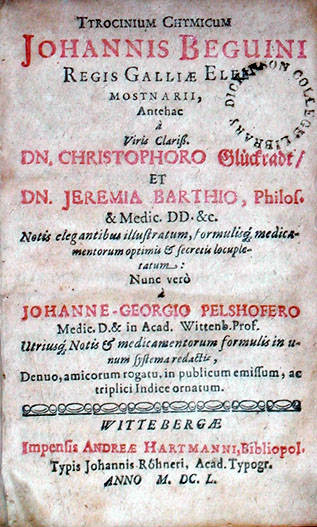
Title page of a 1650 edition of Tyrocinium Chymicum.

Tyrocinium Chymicum was a published set of chemistry lecture notes started by Jean Beguin in 1610 in Paris, France. It has been cited as the first chemistry textbook (as opposed to that for alchemy). Many of the preparations were pharmaceutical in nature.

The work was initially written to teach chemistry to apothecaries and medical practictioners, written by Beguin to avoid having to dictate text to his students during lectures. It was later said by Martin Lister to be "the most influential and popular chymical textbook published in the first half of the seventeenth century".
