= Tapputi =

Mesopotamian perfume maker

Tappūtī-Bēlet-Ekallim (lit. 'Assistant of the Lady of the Palace') (Note: The 'Lady of the Palace' referenced is the goddess Bēlet-Ekalli.) is one of the world's first recorded chemists.

She was a perfumer active in Assur during the reign of Tukulti-Ninurta I. As mentioned in a cuneiform tablet dated around 1200 BC, she used flowers, oil, and calamus along with cyperus, myrrh, and balsam, which after adding water and other solvents were distilled and filtered several times.

Tapputi was the head of a group of professional female perfumers and also was an overseer at the Royal Palace. She worked with someone named (—)-ninu (the first part of her name has been lost).

== In popular culture ==
- Tapputi is one of the main characters of the animated webseries Super Science Friends.

== See also ==
- Timeline of chemistry
- Timeline of women in science
