= Gibbs–Helmholtz equation =

Thermodynamic equation

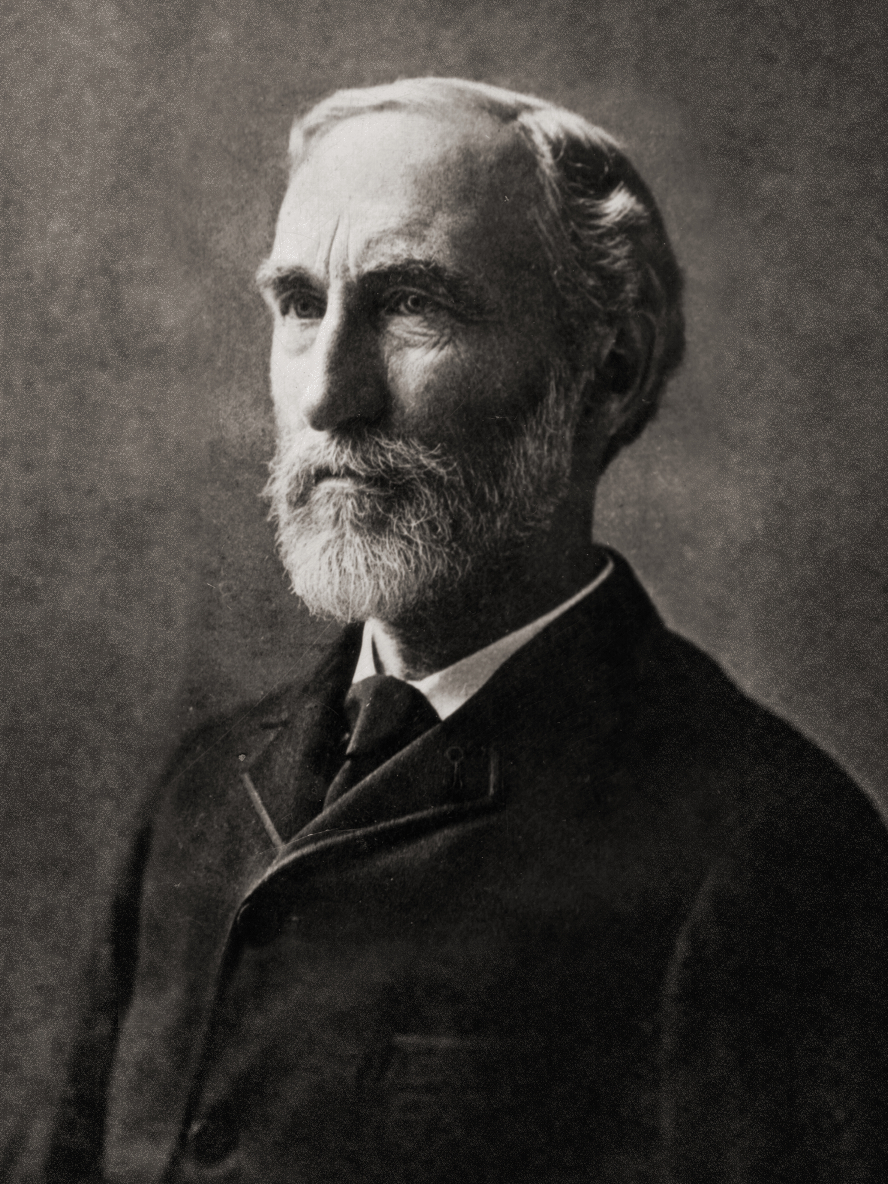
Josiah Willard Gibbs developed the concept of Gibbs free energy, which plays a part in the equation

The Gibbs–Helmholtz equation is a thermodynamic equation used to calculate changes in the Gibbs free energy of a system as a function of temperature. It was originally presented in an 1882 paper entitled "Die Thermodynamik chemischer Vorgänge" by Hermann von Helmholtz. It describes how the Gibbs free energy, which was presented originally by Josiah Willard Gibbs, varies with temperature. It was derived by Helmholtz first, and Gibbs derived it only 6 years later. The attribution to Gibbs goes back to Wilhelm Ostwald, who first translated Gibbs' monograph into German and promoted it in Europe.

The equation is:

$\left( \frac{\partial \left( \frac{G} {T} \right) } {\partial T} \right)_p = - \frac {H} {T^2},$

where H is the enthalpy, T the absolute temperature and G the Gibbs free energy of the system, all at constant pressure p. The equation states that the change in the G/T ratio at constant pressure as a result of an infinitesimally small change in temperature is a factor H/T^{2}.

Similar equations include

	$U = -T^2\left(\frac{\partial}{\partial T}\frac FT\right)_V$		$F = -S^2\left(\frac{\partial}{\partial S}\frac US\right)_V$	
$U = -P^2\left(\frac{\partial}{\partial P}\frac{H}{P}\right)_S$	$U$	$\leftrightarrow U-F = TS$	$F$	$F = -P^2\left(\frac{\partial}{\partial P}\frac GP\right)_T$
	$\updownarrow U-H = -PV$		$\updownarrow G-F = PV$	
$H = -V^2\left(\frac{\partial}{\partial V}\frac UV\right)_S$	$H$	$\leftrightarrow G-H = -TS$	$G$	$G = -V^2\left(\frac{\partial}{\partial V}\frac{F}{V}\right)_T$
	$H = -T^2\left(\frac{\partial}{\partial T}\frac GT\right)_P$		$G = -S^2\left(\frac{\partial}{\partial S}\frac{H}{S}\right)_p$	

== Chemical reactions and work ==
The typical applications of this equation are to chemical reactions. The equation reads:

$$\left( \frac{\partial ( \Delta G^\ominus/T ) } {\partial T} \right)_p = - \frac {\Delta H^\ominus} {T^2}$$

with ΔG as the change in Gibbs energy due to reaction, and ΔH as the enthalpy of reaction (often, but not necessarily, assumed to be independent of temperature). The ~~o~~ denotes the use of standard states, and particularly the choice of a particular standard pressure (1 bar), to calculate ΔG and ΔH.

Integrating with respect to T (again p is constant) yields:

$$\frac{\Delta G^\ominus(T_2)}{T_2} - \frac{\Delta G^\ominus(T_1)}{T_1} = \Delta H^\ominus \left(\frac{1}{T_2} - \frac{1}{T_1}\right)$$

This equation quickly enables the calculation of the Gibbs free energy change for a chemical reaction at any temperature T_{2} with knowledge of just the standard Gibbs free energy change of formation and the standard enthalpy change of formation for the individual components.

Also, using the reaction isotherm equation, that is

$$\frac{\Delta G^\ominus}{T} = -R \ln K$$

which relates the Gibbs energy to a chemical equilibrium constant, the van 't Hoff equation can be derived.

Since the change in a system's Gibbs energy is equal to the maximum amount of non-expansion work that the system can do in a process, the Gibbs–Helmholtz equation may be used to estimate how much non-expansion work can be done by a chemical process as a function of temperature. For example, the capacity of rechargeable electric batteries can be estimated as a function of temperature using the Gibbs–Helmholtz equation.

== Derivation ==
=== Background ===
The definition of the Gibbs function is
$$H = G + ST$$
where H is the enthalpy defined by:
$$H = U + pV$$

Taking differentials of each definition to find dH and dG, then using the fundamental thermodynamic relation (always true for reversible or irreversible processes):
$$dU = T\,dS - p\,dV$$
where S is the entropy, V is volume, (minus sign due to reversibility, in which dU = 0: work other than pressure-volume may be done and is equal to −pV) leads to the "reversed" form of the initial fundamental relation into a new master equation:
$$dG = - S\,dT + V\,dp$$

This is the Gibbs free energy for a closed system. The Gibbs–Helmholtz equation can be derived by this second master equation, and the chain rule for partial derivatives.

Derivation

Starting from the equation
$$dG =  - S\,dT + V\,dp$$
for the differential of G, and remembering
$$H = G + T\,S ,$$
one computes the differential of the ratio G/T by applying the product rule of differentiation in the version for differentials:
$$\begin{align}
d\left(\frac{G}{T}\right)
&= \frac{T\, dG - G\, dT}{T^2}
= \frac{T\, (-S \,dT + V \, dp) - G\, dT}{T^2} \\
&= \frac{-T\, S \,dT -G\,dT + T\, V \, dp}{T^2}
= \frac{-(G + T\,S)\,dT + T\, V \, dp}{T^2} \\
&= \frac{-H \,dT + T\,V\,dp}{T^2}
\end{align}\,\!$$

Therefore,
$$d\left(\frac{G}{T}\right) = -\frac{H}{T^2}\, dT + \frac{V}{T}\, dp \,\!$$

A comparison with the general expression for a total differential
$$d\left(\frac{G}{T}\right) =
\left( \frac{\partial(G/T)}{\partial T} \right)_p \, dT
+ \left( \frac{\partial(G/T)}{\partial p} \right)_T \, dp$$
gives the change of G/T with respect to T at constant pressure (i.e. when dp = 0), the Gibbs–Helmholtz equation:
$$\left( \frac{\partial(G/T)}{\partial T} \right)_p = -\frac{H}{T^2}$$
