= Kristian Kornelius Hagemann Brandt =

Norwegian military officer and engineer (1831–1905)

Kristian Kornelius Hagemann Brandt (8 July 1831 – 24 July 1905) was a Norwegian military officer and engineer.

He was born in Eidsberg. He was a brother of law professor Fredrik Peter Brandt, and was the father of medicine professor Kristian Kornelius Hagemann Brandt (1859–1932) and Major General Fredrik Oscar Brandt (1860–1934).

From 1861 to 1862, he was the chairman of the Norwegian Polytechnic Society. He was elected to the Parliament of Norway in 1865 and 1868, representing the constituency of Moss og Drøbak. While serving here, he proposed an inquiry into the question of a railway in Smaalenenes Amt. He has thus been called "the father of the Smaalenene Line".

From 1872 to 1873, he served as the road inspector of Akershus Amt. In 1890, he reached the military rank of Major. He died in 1905.

Preceded by Johannes Benedictus Klingenberg	Chairman of the Norwegian Polytechnic Society; 1861–1862	Succeeded by Peter Høier Holtermann
