= Johannes Benedictus Klingenberg =

Norwegian military officer and engineer (1817–1882)

Johannes Benedictus Klingenberg (28 April 1817 – 8 July 1882) was a Norwegian military officer and engineer.

He was a son of bailiff Johan Nicolai Klingenberg (1777–1865), and also the uncle of pianist Alf Klingenberg (1867–1944), and the maternal grandfather and paternal granduncle of Odd Sverressøn Klingenberg and Kaare Sverressøn Klingenberg.

He worked in the country's capital Christiania. He organized the waterworks of the city in 1855, and had a national influence in this field. He became leader of the city fire department in 1861. In the military, he held the rank of major.

From 1860 to 1861, and 1872 to 1874, he was the chairman of the Norwegian Polytechnic Society.

Preceded by L. Segelcke	Chairman of the Norwegian Polytechnic Society; 1860–1861	Succeeded by Kristian Kornelius Hagemann Brandt
Preceded by Cato Maximilian Guldberg	Chairman of the Norwegian Polytechnic Society; 1872–1874	Succeeded by Cato Maximilian Guldberg
