= Gibbs free energy =

Type of thermodynamic potential

In thermodynamics, the Gibbs free energy (or Gibbs energy as the recommended name; symbol $G$) is a thermodynamic potential that can be used to calculate the maximum amount of work, other than pressure–volume work, that may be performed by a thermodynamically closed system at constant temperature and pressure. It also provides a necessary condition for processes such as chemical reactions that may occur under these conditions. The Gibbs free energy is expressed as

$$G(p,T) = U + pV - TS = H - TS$$

where:

- $U$ is the internal energy of the system
- $H$ is the enthalpy of the system
- $S$ is the entropy of the system
- $T$ is the temperature of the system
- $V$ is the volume of the system
- $p$ is the pressure of the system (which must be equal to that of the surroundings for mechanical equilibrium).

The Gibbs free energy change ($\Delta G = \Delta H - T\,\Delta S$, measured in joules in SI) is the maximum amount of non-volume expansion work that can be extracted from a closed system (one that can exchange heat and work with its surroundings, but not matter) at fixed temperature and pressure. This maximum can be attained only in a completely reversible process. When a system transforms reversibly from an initial state to a final state under these conditions, the decrease in Gibbs free energy equals the work done by the system to its surroundings, minus the work of the pressure forces.

The Gibbs energy is the thermodynamic potential that is minimized when a system reaches chemical equilibrium at constant pressure and temperature when not driven by an applied electrolytic voltage. Its derivative with respect to the reaction coordinate of the system then vanishes at the equilibrium point. As such, a reduction in $G$ is necessary for a reaction to be spontaneous under these conditions.

The concept of Gibbs free energy, originally called available energy, was developed in the 1870s by the American scientist Josiah Willard Gibbs. In 1873, Gibbs described this "available energy" as

the greatest amount of mechanical work which can be obtained from a given quantity of a certain substance in a given initial state, without increasing its total volume or allowing heat to pass to or from external bodies, except such as at the close of the processes are left in their initial condition.

The initial state of the body, according to Gibbs, is supposed to be such that "the body can be made to pass from it to states of dissipated energy by reversible processes". In his 1876 magnum opus On the Equilibrium of Heterogeneous Substances, a graphical analysis of multi-phase chemical systems, he engaged his thoughts on chemical-free energy in full.

If the reactants and products are all in their thermodynamic standard states, then the defining equation is written as $\Delta G^\circ = \Delta H^\circ - T\,\Delta S^\circ$, where $H$ is enthalpy, $T$ is absolute temperature, and $S$ is entropy.

== Overview ==
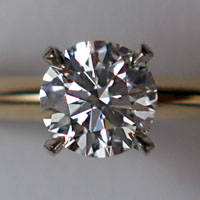
The reaction C_{(s)}^{diamond} → C_{(s)}^{graphite} has a negative change in Gibbs free energy and is therefore thermodynamically favorable at 25 °C and 1 atm. However, the reaction is too slow to be observed, because of its very high activation energy. Whether a reaction is thermodynamically favorable does not determine its rate.

According to the second law of thermodynamics, for systems reacting at fixed temperature and pressure without input of non-Pressure Volume ($pV$) work, there is a general natural tendency to achieve a minimum of the Gibbs free energy.

A quantitative measure of the favorability of a given reaction under these conditions is the change $\Delta G$ in Gibbs free energy that is (or would be) caused by the reaction. As a necessary condition for the reaction to occur at constant temperature and pressure, $\Delta G$ must be smaller than the non-pressure-volume (non-$pV$, e.g., electrical) work, which is often equal to zero (in which case $\Delta G$ must be negative). $\Delta G$ equals the maximum amount of non-$pV$ work that can be performed as a result of the chemical reaction for the case of a reversible process. If analysis indicates a positive $\Delta G$ for a reaction, then energy — in the form of electrical or other non-$pV$ work — would have to be added to the reacting system for $\Delta G$ to be smaller than the non-$pV$ work and make it possible for the reaction to occur.

One can think of $\Delta G$ as the amount of "free" or "useful" energy available to do non-$pV$ work at constant temperature and pressure. The equation can be also seen from the perspective of the system taken together with its surroundings (the rest of the universe). First, one assumes that the given reaction at constant temperature and pressure is the only one that is occurring. Then the entropy released or absorbed by the system equals the entropy that the environment must absorb or release, respectively. The reaction will only be allowed if the total entropy change of the universe is zero or positive. This is reflected in a negative $\Delta G$, and the reaction is called an exergonic process.

If two chemical reactions are coupled, then an otherwise endergonic reaction (one with positive $\Delta G$) can be made to happen. The input of heat into an inherently endergonic reaction, such as the elimination of cyclohexanol to cyclohexene, can be seen as coupling an unfavorable reaction (elimination) to a favorable one (burning of coal or other provision of heat) such that the total entropy change of the universe is greater than or equal to zero, making the total Gibbs free energy change of the coupled reactions negative.

In traditional use, the term "free" was included in "Gibbs free energy" to mean "available in the form of useful work". The characterization becomes more precise if we add the qualification that it is the energy available for non-pressure-volume work. (An analogous, but slightly different, meaning of "free" applies in conjunction with the Helmholtz free energy, for systems at constant temperature). However, an increasing number of books and journal articles do not include the attachment "free", referring to $G$ as simply "Gibbs energy". This is the result of a 1988 IUPAC meeting to set unified terminologies for the international scientific community, in which the removal of the adjective "free" was recommended. This standard, however, has not yet been universally adopted.

The name "free enthalpy" was also used for $G$ in the past.

== History ==
The quantity called "free energy" is a more advanced and accurate replacement for the outdated term affinity, which was used by chemists in the earlier years of physical chemistry to describe the force that caused chemical reactions.

In 1873, Josiah Willard Gibbs published A Method of Geometrical Representation of the Thermodynamic Properties of Substances by Means of Surfaces, in which he sketched the principles of his new equation that was able to predict or estimate the tendencies of various natural processes to ensue when bodies or systems are brought into contact. By studying the interactions of homogeneous substances in contact, i.e., bodies composed of part solid, part liquid, and part vapor, and by using a three-dimensional volume-entropy-internal energy graph, Gibbs was able to determine three states of equilibrium, i.e., "necessarily stable", "neutral", and "unstable", and whether or not changes would ensue. Further, Gibbs stated:

If we wish to express in a single equation the necessary and sufficient condition of thermodynamic equilibrium for a substance when surrounded by a medium of constant pressure $p$ and temperature $T$, this equation may be written:

$\delta(\epsilon - T\eta + pv) = 0$

when $\delta$ refers to the variation produced by any variations in the state of the parts of the body, and (when different parts of the body are in different states) in the proportion in which the body is divided between the different states. The condition of stable equilibrium is that the value of the expression in the parenthesis shall be a minimum.

In this description, as used by Gibbs, $\epsilon$ refers to the internal energy of the body, $\eta$ refers to the entropy of the body, and $v$ is the volume of the body.

Thereafter, in 1882, the German scientist Hermann von Helmholtz characterized the affinity as the largest quantity of work which can be gained when the reaction is carried out in a reversible manner, e.g., electrical work in a reversible cell. The maximum work is thus regarded as the diminution of the free, or available, energy of the system (Gibbs free energy $G$ at constant $T$ and $P$ or Helmholtz free energy $F$ at constant $T$ and $V$), whilst the heat given out is usually a measure of the diminution of the total energy of the system (internal energy). Thus, $G$ or $F$ is the amount of energy "free" for work under the given conditions.

Until this point, the general view had been such that: "all chemical reactions drive the system to a state of equilibrium in which the affinities of the reactions vanish". Over the next 60 years, the term affinity came to be replaced with the term free energy. According to chemistry historian Henry Leicester, the influential 1923 textbook Thermodynamics and the Free Energy of Chemical Substances by Gilbert N. Lewis and Merle Randall led to the replacement of the term "affinity" by the term "free energy" in much of the English-speaking world.

== Definitions ==
Willard Gibbs' 1873 available energy (free energy) graph, which shows a plane perpendicular to the axis of $v$ (volume) and passing through point $\mathrm{A}$, which represents the initial state of the body. $\mathrm{MN}$ is the section of the surface of dissipated energy. $\mathrm{Q}\epsilon$ and $\mathrm{Q}\eta$ are sections of the planes $\eta = 0$ and $\epsilon = 0$, and therefore parallel to the axes of $\epsilon$ (internal energy) and $\eta$ (entropy), respectively. $\mathrm{AD}$ and $\mathrm{AE}$ are the energy and entropy of the body in its initial state, $\mathrm{AB}$ and $\mathrm{AC}$ its available energy (Gibbs free energy) and its capacity for entropy (the amount by which the entropy of the body can be increased without changing the energy of the body or increasing its volume), respectively.

The Gibbs free energy is defined as

$$G(p,T) = U + pV - TS\, ,$$

which is the same as

$$G(p,T) = H - TS\, ,$$

where:

- $U$ is the internal energy (SI unit: joule),
- $p$ is pressure (SI unit: pascal),
- $V$ is volume (SI unit: m^{3}),
- $T$ is the temperature (SI unit: kelvin),
- $S$ is the entropy (SI unit: joule per kelvin),
- $H$ is the enthalpy (SI unit: joule).

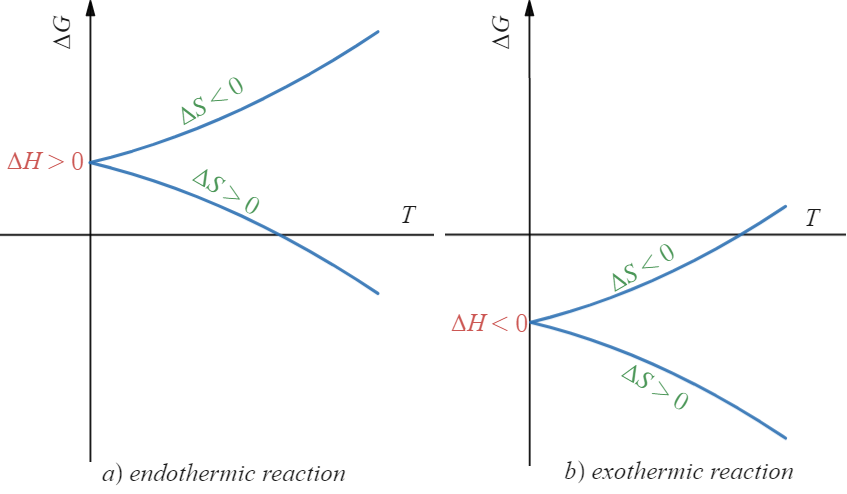

The expression for the infinitesimal reversible change in the Gibbs free energy as a function of its "natural variables" $p$ and $T$, for an open system, subjected to the operation of external forces (for instance, electrical or magnetic) $X_i$, which cause the external parameters of the system $a_i$ to change by an amount $\mathrm{d}a_i$, can be derived as follows from the first law for reversible processes:

$$\begin{align}
T\,\mathrm{d}S &= \mathrm{d}U + p\,\mathrm{d}V - \sum_{i=1}^k \mu_i \,\mathrm{d}N_i + \sum_{i=1}^n X_i \,\mathrm{d}a_i + \cdots \\
\mathrm{d}(TS) - S\,\mathrm{d}T &= \mathrm{d}U + \mathrm{d}(pV) - V\,\mathrm{d}p - \sum_{i=1}^k \mu_i \,\mathrm{d}N_i + \sum_{i=1}^n X_i \,\mathrm{d}a_i + \cdots \\
\mathrm{d}(U - TS + pV) &= V\,\mathrm{d}p - S\,\mathrm{d}T + \sum_{i=1}^k \mu_i \,\mathrm{d}N_i - \sum_{i=1}^n X_i \,\mathrm{d}a_i + \cdots \\
\mathrm{d}G &= V\,\mathrm{d}p - S\,\mathrm{d}T + \sum_{i=1}^k \mu_i \,\mathrm{d}N_i - \sum_{i=1}^n X_i \,\mathrm{d}a_i + \cdots
\end{align}$$

where:

- $\mu_i$ is the chemical potential of the $i$-th chemical component. (SI unit: joules per particle or joules per mole)
- $N_i$ is the number of particles (or number of moles) composing the $i$-th chemical component.

This is one form of the Gibbs fundamental equation. In the infinitesimal expression, the term involving the chemical potential accounts for changes in Gibbs free energy resulting from an influx or outflux of particles. In other words, it holds for an open system or for a closed, chemically reacting system where the $N_i$ are changing. For a closed, non-reacting system, this term may be dropped.

Any number of extra terms may be added, depending on the particular system being considered. Aside from mechanical work, a system may, in addition, perform numerous other types of work. For example, in the infinitesimal expression, the contractile work energy associated with a thermodynamic system that is a contractile fiber that shortens by an amount $-\mathrm{d}l$ under a force $f$ would result in a term $f\,\mathrm{d}l$ being added. If a quantity of charge $-\mathrm{d}e$ is acquired by a system at an electrical potential $\Psi$, the electrical work associated with this is $-\Psi\,\mathrm{d}e$, which would be included in the infinitesimal expression. Other work terms are added on per system requirements.

Each quantity in the equations above can be divided by the amount of substance, measured in moles, to form molar Gibbs free energy. The Gibbs free energy is one of the most important thermodynamic functions for the characterization of a system. It is a factor in determining outcomes such as the voltage of an electrochemical cell, and the equilibrium constant for a reversible reaction. In isothermal, isobaric systems, Gibbs free energy can be thought of as a "dynamic" quantity, in that it is a representative measure of the competing effects of the enthalpic and entropic driving forces involved in a thermodynamic process.

Relation to other relevant parameters

The temperature dependence of the Gibbs energy for an ideal gas is given by the Gibbs–Helmholtz equation, and its pressure dependence is given by

$$\frac{G}{N} = \frac{G^\circ}{N} + kT\ln \frac{p}{p^\circ}\, .$$

or more conveniently as its chemical potential:

$$\frac{G}{N} = \mu = \mu^\circ + kT\ln \frac{p}{p^\circ}\, .$$

In non-ideal systems, fugacity comes into play.

== Derivation ==
The Gibbs free energy total differential with respect to natural variables may be derived by Legendre transforms of the internal energy.

$$\mathrm{d}U = T\,\mathrm{d}S - p\,\mathrm{d}V + \sum_i \mu_i \,\mathrm{d} N_i\, .$$

The definition of $G$ from above is

$$G = U + pV - TS\, .$$

Taking the total differential, we have

$$\mathrm{d}G = \mathrm{d}U + p\,\mathrm{d}V + V\,\mathrm{d}p - T\,\mathrm{d}S - S\,\mathrm{d}T\, .$$

Replacing $\mathrm{d}U$ with the result from the first law gives

$$\begin{align}
\mathrm{d}G &= T\,\mathrm{d}S - p\,\mathrm{d}V + \sum_i \mu_i \,\mathrm{d}N_i + p \,\mathrm{d}V + V\,\mathrm{d}p - T\,\mathrm{d}S - S\,\mathrm{d}T \\
&= V\,\mathrm{d}p - S\,\mathrm{d}T + \sum_i \mu_i \,\mathrm{d} N_i\, .
\end{align}$$

The natural variables of $G$ are then $p$, $T$, and $\left\{N_i\right\}$.

=== Homogeneous systems ===
Because $S$, $V$, and $N_i$ are extensive variables, an Euler relation allows easy integration of $\mathrm{d}U$:

$$U = TS - pV + \sum_i\mu_i N_i\, .$$

Because some of the natural variables of $G$ are intensive, $\mathrm{d}G$ may not be integrated using Euler relations as is the case with internal energy. However, simply substituting the above integrated result for $U$ into the definition of $G$ gives a standard expression for $G$:

$$\begin{align}
G &= U + pV - TS \\
&= \left(TS - pV + \sum_i\mu_i N_i \right) + pV - TS \\
&= \sum_i\mu_i N_i\, .
\end{align}$$

This result shows that the chemical potential of a substance $i$ is its (partial) molecular Gibbs free energy. It applies to homogeneous, macroscopic systems, but not to all thermodynamic systems.

== Gibbs free energy of reactions ==
The system under consideration is held at constant temperature and pressure, and is closed (no matter can come in or out). The Gibbs energy of any system is $1 = G = U + pV - TS$ and an infinitesimal change in $G$, at constant temperature and pressure, yields

$$\mathrm{d}G = \mathrm{d}U + p\,\mathrm{d}V - T\,\mathrm{d}S\, .$$

By the first law of thermodynamics, a change in the internal energy $U$ is given by

$$\mathrm{d}U = \delta Q + \delta W$$

where $\delta Q$ is energy added as heat, and $\delta W$ is energy added as work. The work done on the system may be written as $\delta W = -p\,\mathrm{d}V + \delta W_x$, where $-p\,\mathrm{d}V$ is the mechanical work of compression/expansion done on or by the system and $\delta W_x$ is all other forms of work, which may include electrical, magnetic, etc. Then

$$\mathrm{d}U = \delta Q - p\,\mathrm{d}V + \delta W_x$$

and the infinitesimal change in $G$ is

$$\mathrm{d}G = \delta Q - T\,\mathrm{d}S + \delta W_x\, .$$

The second law of thermodynamics states that for a closed system at constant temperature (in a heat bath), $T\,\mathrm{d}S \ge \delta Q$, and so it follows that

$$\mathrm{d}G \le \delta W_x\, .$$

Assuming that only mechanical work is done, this simplifies to

$$\mathrm{d}G \le 0\, .$$

This means that for such a system when not in equilibrium, the Gibbs energy will always be decreasing, and in equilibrium, the infinitesimal change $\mathrm{d}G$ will be zero. In particular, this will be true if the system is experiencing any number of internal chemical reactions on its path to equilibrium.

=== In electrochemical thermodynamics ===
When electric charge $\mathrm{d}Q_\mathrm{ele}$ is passed between the electrodes of an electrochemical cell generating an emf $\mathcal{E}$, an electrical work term appears in the expression for the change in Gibbs energy:

$$\mathrm{d}G = -S\,\mathrm{d}T + V\,\mathrm{d}p + \mathcal{E} \,\mathrm{d}Q_\mathrm{ele}\, ,$$

where $S$ is the entropy, $V$ is the system volume, $p$ is its pressure and $T$ is its absolute temperature.

The combination ($\mathcal{E}$, $Q_\mathrm{ele}$) is an example of a conjugate pair of variables. At constant pressure the above equation produces a Maxwell relation that links the change in open cell voltage with temperature $T$ (a measurable quantity) to the change in entropy $S$ when charge is passed isothermally and isobarically. The latter is closely related to the reaction entropy of the electrochemical reaction that lends the battery its power. This Maxwell relation is:

$$\left(\frac{\partial \mathcal{E}}{\partial T}\right)_{Q_\mathrm{ele},p} = -\left( \frac{\partial S}{\partial Q_\mathrm{ele}} \right)_{T,p}$$

If a mole of ions goes into solution (for example, in a Daniell cell, as discussed below) the charge through the external circuit is

$$\Delta Q_\mathrm{ele} = -n_0 F_0 \, ,$$

where $n_0$ is the number of electrons/ion, and $F_0$ is the Faraday constant, and the minus sign indicates discharge of the cell. Assuming constant pressure and volume, the thermodynamic properties of the cell are related strictly to the behavior of its emf by

$$\Delta H = -n_0 F_0 \left(\mathcal{E} - T\frac{\mathrm{d}\mathcal{E}}{\mathrm{d}T}\right) \, ,$$

where $\Delta H$ is the enthalpy of reaction. The quantities on the right are all directly measurable.

== Useful identities to derive the Nernst equation ==
During a reversible electrochemical reaction at constant temperature and pressure, the following equations involving the Gibbs free energy hold:

- $\Delta_\mathrm{r} G = \Delta_\text{r} G^\circ + R T \ln Q_\mathrm{r}$ (see chemical equilibrium),
- $\Delta_\mathrm{r} G^\circ = -R T \ln K_\mathrm{eq}$ (for a system at chemical equilibrium),
- $\Delta_\mathrm{r} G = w_{\mathrm{elec},\mathrm{rev}} = -nF\mathcal{E}$ (for a reversible electrochemical process at constant temperature and pressure),
- $\Delta_\mathrm{r} G^\circ = -nF\mathcal{E}^\circ$ (definition of $\mathcal{E}^\circ$),

and rearranging gives

$$\begin{align}
nF\mathcal{E}^\circ &= RT \ln K_\text{eq} \\
nF\mathcal{E} &= nF\mathcal{E}^\circ - R T \ln Q_\text{r} \\
\mathcal{E} &= \mathcal{E}^\circ - \frac{R T}{n F} \ln Q_\text{r}\, ,
\end{align}$$

which relates the cell potential resulting from the reaction to the equilibrium constant and reaction quotient for that reaction (Nernst equation), where

- $\Delta_\mathrm{r}G$, Gibbs free energy change per mole of reaction,
- $\Delta_\mathrm{r}G^\circ$, Gibbs free energy change per mole of reaction for unmixed reactants and products at standard conditions (i.e. 298 K, 100 kPa, 1 M of each reactant and product),
- $R$, gas constant,
- $T$, absolute temperature,
- $Q_\mathrm{r}$, reaction quotient (unitless),
- $K_\mathrm{eq}$, equilibrium constant (unitless),
- $w_{\mathrm{elec},\mathrm{rev}}$, electrical work in a reversible process (chemistry sign convention),
- $n$, number of moles of electrons transferred in the reaction,
- $F = N_\mathrm{A}e \approx 96485\,\mathrm{C/mol}$, Faraday constant (charge per mole of electrons),
- $\mathcal{E}$, cell potential,
- $\mathcal{E}^\circ$, standard cell potential.

Moreover, we also have

$$\begin{align}
K_\mathrm{eq} &= e^{-\frac{\Delta_\mathrm{r} G^\circ}{RT}}\, , \\
\Delta_\mathrm{r} G^\circ &= -RT\left(\ln K_\mathrm{eq}\right) = -2.303\,RT\left(\log_{10} K_\mathrm{eq}\right)\, ,
\end{align}$$

which relates the equilibrium constant with Gibbs free energy. This implies that at equilibrium, $Q_\mathrm{r} = K_\mathrm{eq}$ and $\Delta_\mathrm{r}G = 0$.

== Standard Gibbs energy change of formation ==
Table of selected substances
Substance (state)	$\Delta_\mathrm{f}G^\circ$	
Substance (state)	(kJ/mol)	(kcal/mol)
NO (g)	87.6	20.9
NO_{2} (g)	51.3	12.3
N_{2}O (g)	103.7	24.78
H_{2}O (g)	−228.6	−54.64
H_{2}O (l)	−237.1	−56.67
CO_{2} (g)	−394.4	−94.26
CO (g)	−137.2	−32.79
CH_{4} (g)	−50.5	−12.1
C_{2}H_{6} (g)	−32.0	−7.65
C_{3}H_{8} (g)	−23.4	−5.59
C_{6}H_{6} (g)	129.7	29.76
C_{6}H_{6} (l)	124.5	31.00

The standard Gibbs free energy of formation of a compound is the change of Gibbs free energy that accompanies the formation of 1 mol of that substance from its component elements, in their standard states (the most stable form of the element at 25 °C and 100 kPa). Its symbol is $\Delta_\mathrm{f}G^\circ$.

All elements in their standard states (diatomic oxygen gas, graphite, etc.) have standard Gibbs free energy change of formation equal to zero, as there is no change involved.

$$\Delta_\mathrm{f}G = \Delta_\mathrm{f}G^\circ + RT \ln Q_\mathrm{f}\, ,$$

where $Q_\mathrm{f}$ is the reaction quotient.

At equilibrium, $\Delta_\mathrm{f}G = 0$ and $Q_\mathrm{f} = K$, so the equation becomes

$$\Delta_\mathrm{f}G^\circ = -RT \ln K\, ,$$

where $K$ is the equilibrium constant of the formation reaction of the substance from the elements in their standard states.

== Graphical interpretation by Gibbs ==
Gibbs free energy was originally defined graphically. In 1873, American scientist Willard Gibbs published his first thermodynamics paper, "Graphical Methods in the Thermodynamics of Fluids", in which Gibbs used the two coordinates of the entropy and volume to represent the state of the body. In his second follow-up paper, "A Method of Geometrical Representation of the Thermodynamic Properties of Substances by Means of Surfaces", published later that year, Gibbs added in the third coordinate of the energy of the body, defined on three figures. In 1874, Scottish physicist James Clerk Maxwell used Gibbs' figures to make a 3D energy-entropy-volume thermodynamic surface of a fictitious water-like substance. Thus, in order to understand the concept of Gibbs free energy, it may help to understand its interpretation by Gibbs as section AB on his figure 3, and as Maxwell sculpted that section on his 3D surface figure.

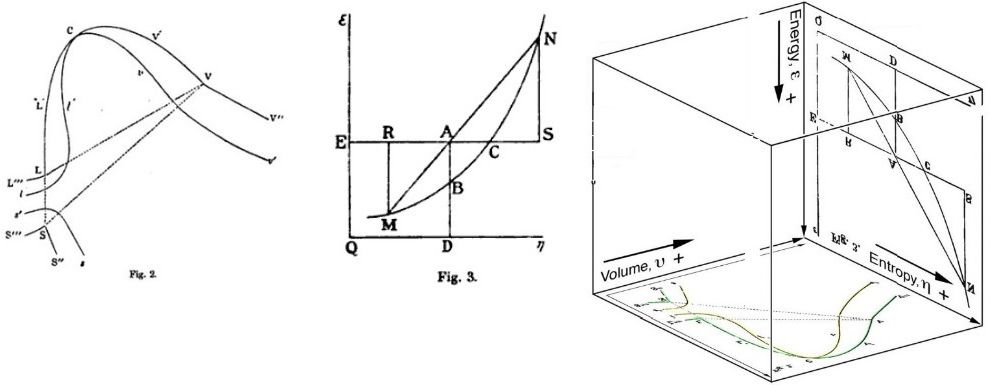
American scientist Willard Gibbs' 1873 figures two and three (above left and middle) used by Scottish physicist James Clerk Maxwell in 1874 to create a three-dimensional entropy, volume, energy thermodynamic surface diagram for a fictitious water-like substance, transposed the two figures of Gibbs (above right) onto the volume-entropy coordinates (transposed to bottom of cube) and energy-entropy coordinates (flipped upside down and transposed to back of cube), respectively, of a three-dimensional Cartesian coordinates; the region $\mathrm{AB}$ being the first-ever three-dimensional representation of Gibbs free energy, or what Gibbs called "available energy"; the region $\mathrm{AC}$ being its capacity for entropy, what Gibbs defined as "the amount by which the entropy of the body can be increased without changing the energy of the body or increasing its volume.

== See also ==
- Bioenergetics
- Calphad (CALculation of PHAse Diagrams)
- Critical point (thermodynamics)
- Electron equivalent
- Enthalpy–entropy compensation
- Free entropy
- Gibbs–Helmholtz equation
- Grand potential
- Non-random two-liquid model (NRTL model) – Gibbs energy of excess and mixing calculation and activity coefficients
- Spinodal – Spinodal Curves (Hessian matrix)
- Standard molar entropy
- Thermodynamic free energy
- UNIQUAC model – Gibbs energy of excess and mixing calculation and activity coefficients
