= Equilibrium dissociation constant =

Equilibrium dissociation constant refers to:

- Dissociation constant
- Equilibrium constant
