= Reaction quotient =

Quantity in chemical thermodynamics

In chemical thermodynamics, the reaction quotient ($Q_\mathrm{r}$ or just $Q$) is a dimensionless quantity that provides a measurement of the relative amounts of products and reactants present in a reaction mixture for a reaction with well-defined overall stoichiometry at a particular point in time. Mathematically, it is defined as the ratio of the activities (or molar concentrations) of the product species over those of the reactant species involved in the chemical reaction, taking stoichiometric coefficients of the reaction into account as exponents of the concentrations. In equilibrium, the reaction quotient is constant over time and is equal to the equilibrium constant.

A general chemical reaction in which $\alpha$ moles of a reactant A and $\beta$ moles of a reactant B react to give $\rho$ moles of a product R and $\sigma$ moles of a product S can be written as

$$\ce{\it \alpha\,\rm A{} + \it \beta\,\rm B{}  <=> \it \rho\,\rm R{} + \it \sigma\,\rm S{}}$$.

The reaction is written as an equilibrium even though, in many cases, it may appear that all of the reactants on one side have been converted to the other side. When any initial mixture of A, B, R, and S is made, and the reaction is allowed to proceed (either in the forward or reverse direction), the reaction quotient $Q_\mathrm{r}$, as a function of time $t$, is defined as

$$Q_\mathrm{r} (t)= \frac{\{\mathrm{R}\}^\rho_t\{\mathrm{S}\}^\sigma_t} {\{\mathrm{A}\}^\alpha_t \{\mathrm{B}\}^\beta_t},$$

where $\{\mathrm{X}\}_t$ denotes the instantaneous activity of a species $\mathrm{X}$ at time $t$. A compact general definition is

$$Q_\mathrm{r}(t) = \prod_j [a_j(t)]^{\nu_j},$$

where $\textstyle \prod_j$ denotes the product across all $j$-indexed variables, $a_j(t)$ is the activity of species $j$ at time $t$, and $\nu_j$ is the stoichiometric number (the stoichiometric coefficient multiplied by +1 for products and −1 for starting materials).

== Relationship to K (the equilibrium constant) ==
As the reaction proceeds with the passage of time, the species' activities, and hence the reaction quotient, change in a way that reduces the free energy of the chemical system. The direction of the change is governed by the Gibbs free energy of reaction by the relation

$$\Delta_\mathrm{r}G = RT\ln\frac{Q_\mathrm{r}}{K}$$,

where K is a constant independent of initial composition, known as the equilibrium constant. The reaction proceeds in the forward direction (towards larger values of $Q_\mathrm{r}$) when $\Delta_\mathrm{r}G < 0$ or in the reverse direction (towards smaller values of $Q_r$) when $\Delta_\mathrm{r}G > 0$. Eventually, as the reaction mixture reaches chemical equilibrium, the activities of the components (and thus the reaction quotient) approach constant values. The equilibrium constant is defined to be the asymptotic value approached by the reaction quotient:

$$Q_\mathrm{r}\to K\;\;\text{and}\;\;\Delta_\mathrm{r}G\to 0\quad (t\to\infty)$$.

The timescale of this process depends on the rate constants of the forward and reverse reactions. In principle, equilibrium is approached asymptotically at $t\to\infty$; in practice, equilibrium is considered to be reached, in a practical sense, when concentrations of the equilibrating species no longer change perceptibly with respect to the analytical instruments and methods used.

If a reaction mixture is initialized with all components having an activity of unity, that is, in their standard states, then

$$Q_\mathrm{r}=1\;\;\text{and}\;\;\Delta_\mathrm{r}G = \Delta_\mathrm{r}G^\circ = -RT\ln K\quad (t=0)$$.

This quantity, $\Delta_\mathrm{r}G^\circ$, is called the standard Gibbs free energy of reaction.

All reactions, regardless of how favorable, are equilibrium processes, though practically speaking, if no starting material is detected after a certain point by a particular analytical technique in question, the reaction is said to go to completion.

== In biochemistry ==
In biochemistry, the reaction quotient is often referred to as the mass-action ratio with the symbol $\Gamma$.

== Applications ==
The reaction quotient can be used to predict the direction and extent of an equilibrium chemical reaction. At equilibrium, the reaction quotient ($Q$) is equal to the equilibrium constant ($K$) for the reaction, where $Q=K$. If $Q>K$, the formation of reactants is favored. This is because the ratio of the numerator to the denominator in $Q$ is greater than that of $K$, indicating there are more products than at equilibrium. As Le Chatelier's Principle states systems tend towards equilibrium, the equilibrium shifts in the reverse direction favoring the formation of the products. Similarly, when $Q<K$, the formation of products is favored and the reaction is progressing in the forwards direction.
