= Alf Klingenberg =

Alfred Klingenberg (8 September 1867 - 20 April 1944), a Norwegian pianist and composer of great distinction, was the Eastman School of Music´s first director (1921–23). He was succeeded by composer Howard Hanson in 1924. Klingenberg started the DKG Institute of Musical Art in Rochester 1912. This school would later become the Eastman School of Music. George Eastman bought the school from Klingenberg in 1919. Klingenberg was a friend of Jean Sibelius, and secured the composer a position on the faculty during his directorship.

Alf Klingenberg was the first cousin once removed of Trondheim mayor Odd Sverressøn Klingenberg, and nephew of engineer Johannes Benedictus Klingenberg.

Preceded by New creation	Director of the Eastman School of Music; 1921–1923	Succeeded by Raymond Wilson (Acting Director
Preceded by New creation	Director of the Eastman School of Music; 1921–1923	Succeeded by Howard Hanson
