= Eastman School of Music =

Music school in Rochester, New York, US

Coordinates: 43°9′27.63″N 77°36′5.18″W

Eastman School of Music University of Rochester
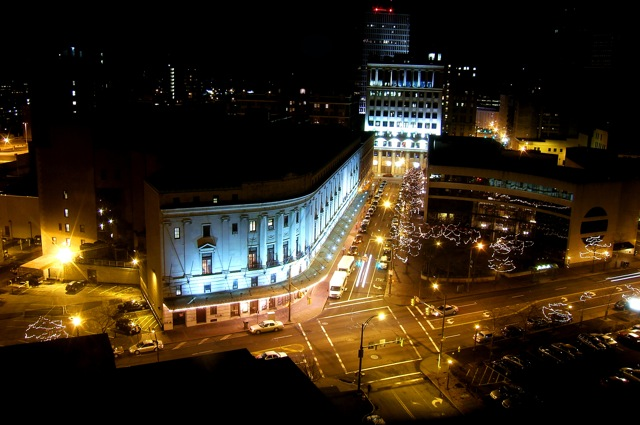
- Eastman at night
- Type: Private music school
- Established: 1921; 105 years ago
- Parent institution: University of Rochester
- Dean: Kate Sheeran
- Academic staff: 130
- Students: 950
- Undergraduates: 500
- Postgraduates: 450
- Location: Rochester, New York, United States
- Campus: Urban
- Website: esm.rochester.edu

- Location within New York Location within the United States

The Eastman School of Music is the music school of the University of Rochester, a private research university in Rochester, New York, United States. Established in 1921 by celebrated industrialist and philanthropist George Eastman, it was the first professional school of the university.

The school offers Bachelor of Music (BM) degrees, Master of Arts (MA) degrees, Master of Music (MM) degrees, Doctor of Philosophy (PhD) degrees, and Doctor of Musical Arts (DMA) degrees in various musical fields, along with a special dual degree with the College of Arts & Sciences for students with multiple interests. The school has three performing orchestras, the Eastman Philharmonia, the Eastman School Symphony Orchestra, and the Philharmonia Chamber Orchestra.

As of 2024, there were more than 950 students enrolled in the collegiate division of the Eastman School (approximately 500 undergraduate and 450 graduate students).

== History ==
Alfred Klingenberg, a Norwegian pianist, was the school's first director, serving from 1921 to 1923. He was succeeded by composer Howard Hanson in 1924, who had an enormous impact on the development of the school, including influencing the creation the first Doctor of Musical Arts degree in the United States. Upon his retirement in 1964, after serving as director of the school for 40 years, Hanson was succeeded by conductor Walter Hendl.

Hendl served as director from 1964 to 1972, and was then succeeded by pianist and musicologist Robert Freeman who served from 1972 to 1996. Associate Director Daniel Patrylak served as the acting director from the time of Hendl's resignation (May 1972) until Robert Freeman assumed the position in July 1973. Following the resignation of Robert Freeman in 1996, James Undercofler was then appointed Director and Dean of the Eastman School, and held that position until he resigned in 2006 to accept the position of CEO and President of the Philadelphia Orchestra.

Jamal Rossi, an Eastman alumnus, was appointed Interim Dean of the Eastman School in April 2006. On May 21, 2007, composer/conductor Douglas Lowry, formerly the dean of the University of Cincinnati College-Conservatory of Music, was appointed Dean of the Eastman School, to begin serving in 2007. Following Lowry's death in 2013, Rossi was appointed Dean.

== Campus and facilities ==
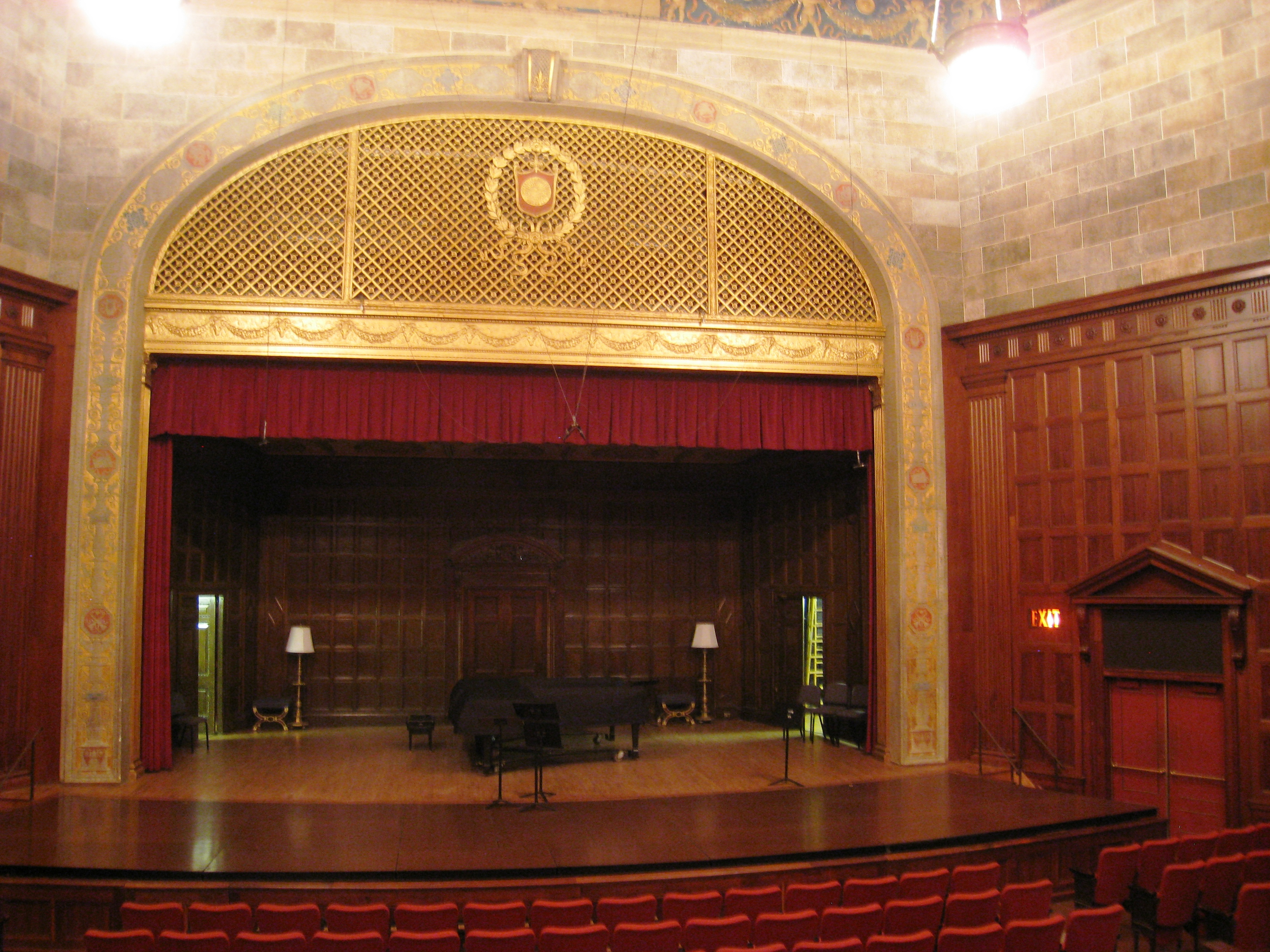
Kilbourn Hall

The Eastman School occupies parts of five buildings in downtown Rochester, New York. The main hall includes the renovated 3,094-seat Eastman Theater, the 455-seat Kilbourn Hall, the 222-seat Hatch Recital Hall, and offices for faculty.

The Eastman Theatre opened in 1922 as a center for music, dance, and silent film with orchestral and organ accompaniment. Today, the 3,094-seat theatre is the primary concert hall for the Eastman School's larger ensembles, including its orchestras, wind ensembles, jazz ensembles, and chorale. Also, the Eastman Opera Theatre presents fully staged operatic productions in the theatre each spring. It also is the principal performance venue for the Rochester Philharmonic Orchestra. A $5 million renovation of the theatre was completed in 2004. The theatre is located at 60 Gibbs Street, on the corner of Main and Gibbs Streets. Due to a $10 million donation by Eastman Kodak Inc. in April 2008, the Eastman Theatre was officially renamed "Kodak Hall at Eastman Theatre" upon the renovation's completion in 2010.

The Sibley Music Library—the largest academic music library in North America, is located across the street from the main hall. Hiram Watson Sibley founded the library in 1904 using the fortune he made as first president of Western Union. It moved to its current location in 1989, and occupies 45,000 square feet (4,200 m^{2}) on the 2nd, 3rd and 4th floors of the Miller Center, formerly known as Eastman Place. The Sibley Music Library currently holds almost 750,000 items, ranging from 11th century codices to the latest compositions and recordings. Considered among its jewels are the original drafts of Debussy's impressionistic masterpiece, "La Mer".

The Student Living Center, which is located at 100 Gibbs Street, is the dormitory building of the Eastman School of Music. In 1991, the new building was opened at the corner of Main and Gibbs Streets, replacing the University Avenue dormitories built nearly 70 years earlier. It is a four-story quadrangle and 14-story tower surrounding a landscaped inner courtyard, and contains its own dining hall. The majority of students enrolled in the undergraduate program live on campus in this building.

== Academics ==
The school offers Bachelor of Music (BM) degrees, Master of Arts (MA) degrees, Master of Music (MM) degrees, Doctor of Philosophy (PhD) degrees, and Doctor of Musical Arts (DMA) degrees in many musical fields. The school also awards a "Performer's Certificate" or "Artist's Diploma" to students who demonstrate exceptionally outstanding performance ability. The Institute for Music Leadership, which was formed in 2001, offers a variety of diploma programs designed to educate and give students the skills and experience necessary to meet the demands of performance and education in today's changing musical world. In 2018, The Institute for Music Leadership created a Master of Arts degree in Music Leadership for musicians who seek to lead traditional or non-traditional musical arts organizations.

== Reputation ==
In 2024, Billboard named the Eastman School of Music as the Top Music Business School.

== Faculty and alumni ==
Eastman alumni include jazz bassist Ron Carter, singer Renée Fleming, bass-baritone William Warfield, Canadian Brass co-founder Charles Daellenbach, cellist Robert deMaine, drummer Steve Gadd, bassist Tony Levin, flugelhornist Chuck Mangione, author and journalist Michael Walsh, trumpeter Allen Vizzutti, scholar Horace Clarence Boyer and composers Thomas Henderson Kerr, Jr., George Walker, Maria Schneider, Robert Paterson, and Cardon V. Burnham. Current faculty include musicians and pedagogues like the Ying Quartet, Anthony Dean Griffey, Katherine Ciesinski and Paul O'Dette.

=== Directors and deans ===
- Alfred Klingenberg (Director, 1921–1923)
- Raymond Wilson (Acting Director, 1923–1924)
- Howard Hanson (Director, 1924–1964)
- Walter Hendl (Director, 1964–1972)
- Daniel Patrylak (Acting Director, 1972–1973)
- Robert Freeman (Director, 1973–1996)
- James Undercofler (Acting Director, 1996–1997; Director, 1997–2006)
- Jamal Rossi (Acting Director, 2006–2007; Acting Dean, 2013)
- Douglas Lowry (Dean, 2007–2013)
- Jamal Rossi (Dean, 2014–2024)
- Kate Sheeran (Dean, 2024–present)

== See also ==
- List of concert halls
