= Peter Waage =

Norwegian chemist (1833–1900)

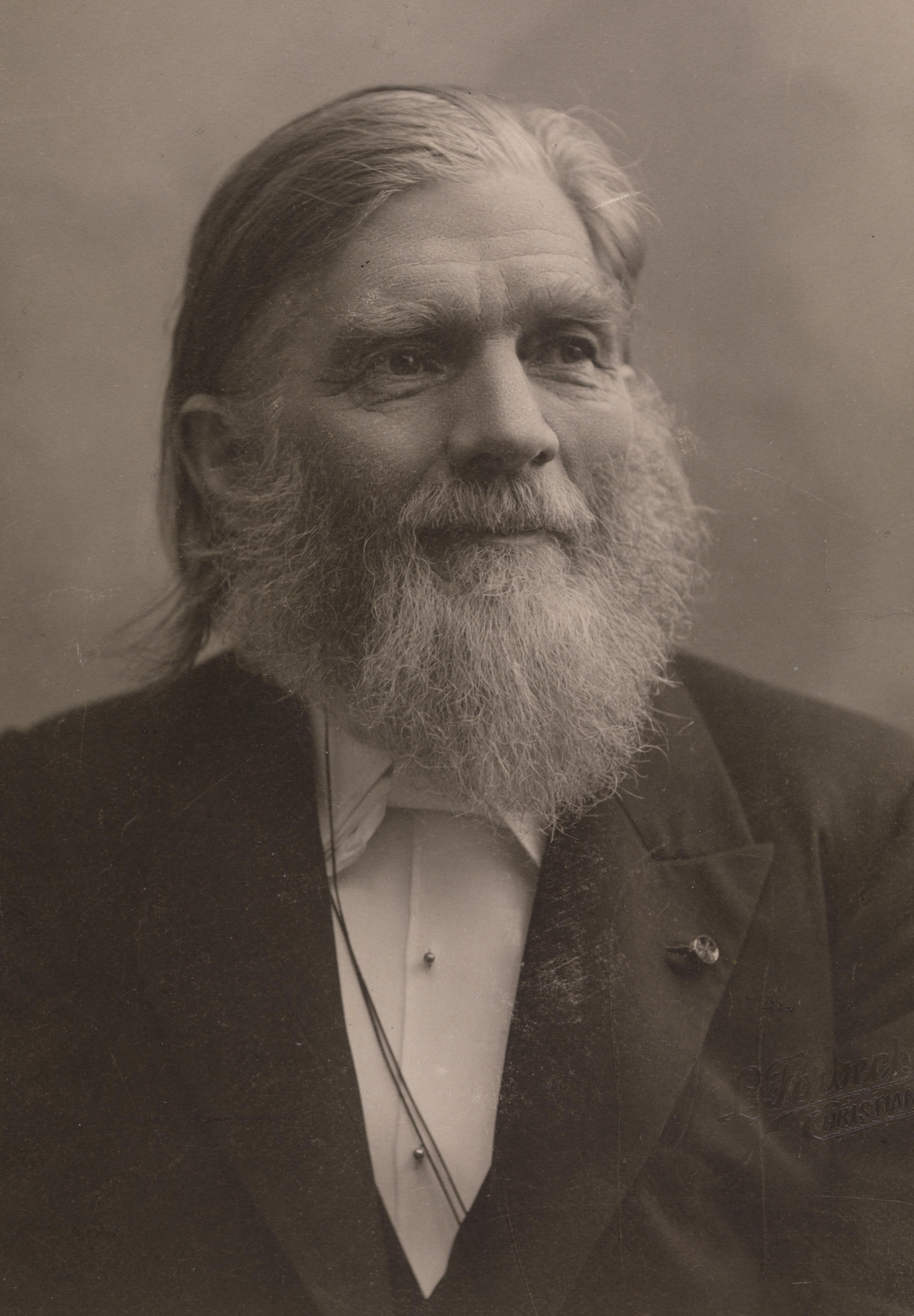
- Peter Waage
- Born: 29 June 1833; Flekkefjord, Norway
- Died: 13 January 1900 (aged 66); Kristiania (now Oslo), Norway
- Education: Royal Frederick University (now University of Oslo)
- Known for: law of mass action
- Awards: Order of St Olav; Knight (1882); Commander (1894)
- Scientific career
- Fields: chemistry
- Workplaces: Royal Frederick University (now University of Oslo)

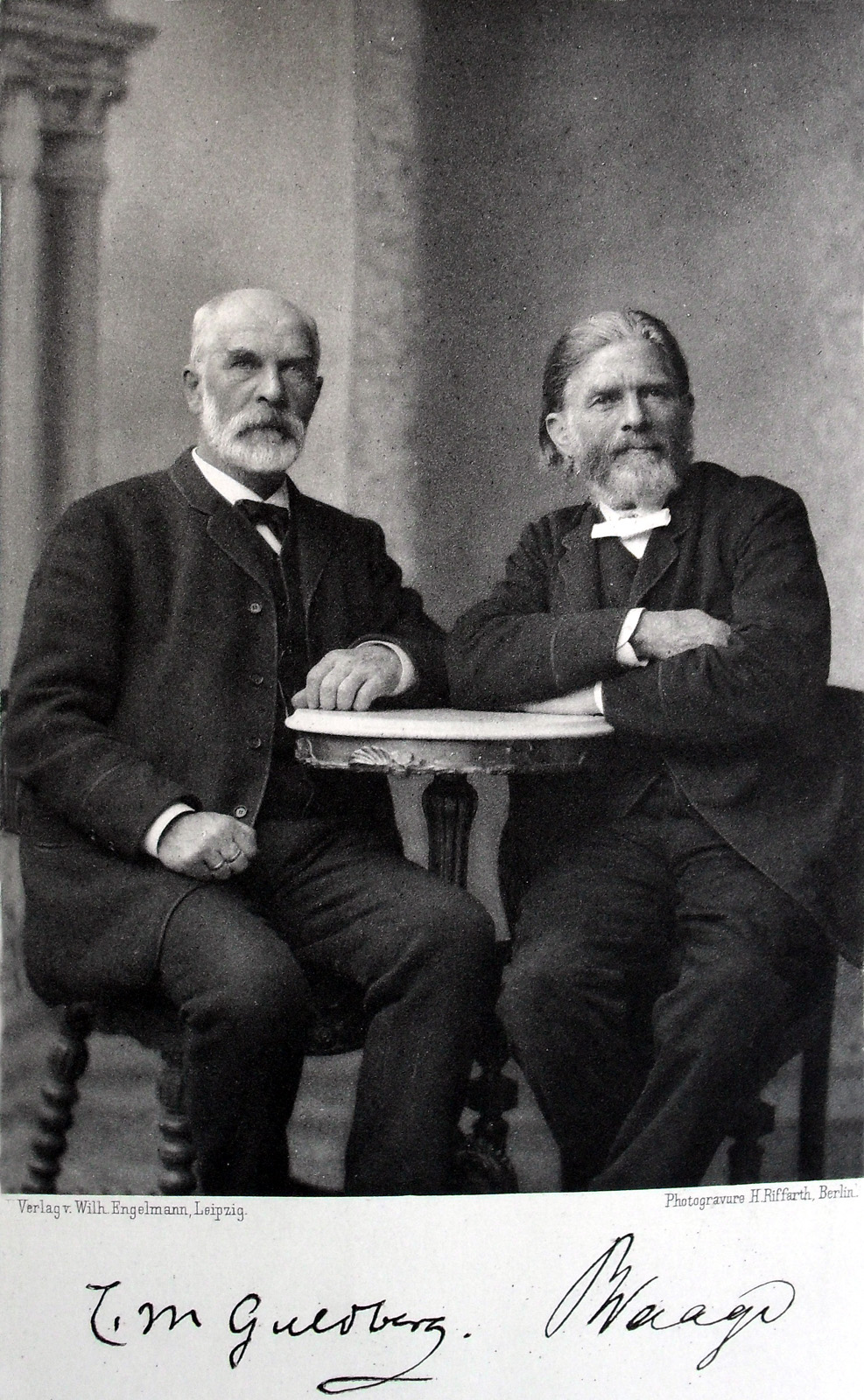
Guldberg and Waage

Peter Waage (29 June 1833 – 13 January 1900) was a Norwegian chemist and professor of chemistry at the University of Kristiania. Along with his brother-in-law Cato Maximilian Guldberg, he co-discovered and developed the law of mass action between 1864 and 1879.

== Biography ==
He grew up on the island of Hidra in Lister og Mandal county, Norway. He was the son of Peder Pedersen Waage (1796–1872) and Regine Lovise Wathne (1802–72). He attended the Bergen Cathedral School and studied chemistry and mineralogy at the University of Kristiania (now University of Oslo) under Adolph Strecker. In 1858, he received the Crown Prince's gold medal (Kronprinsens gullmedalje) for work on the development of a theory of oxygen-containing acid radicals. He became a cand.real. in 1859. He subsequently traveled to France and Germany, where he studied for two years including time spent with Robert Bunsen in Heidelberg.

In 1861, Waage was made an associate professor and in 1866 he was appointed professor of chemistry at the University of Kristiania. He remained a professor at the University over 30 years. He was also chairman of the Norwegian Polytechnic Society from 1868 to 1869, and the first chairman of the Norwegian branch of the YMCA when it was established in 1880. In 1894 Waage was elected to Honorary membership of the Manchester Literary and Philosophical Society.

== Personal life ==
He was married twice. In 1862, he married Johanne Christiane Tandberg Riddervold (1838- 1869), daughter of Hans Riddervold (1795-1876) and Anne Marie Bull (1804-70). Following the death of his first wife, he was married in 1870 with Mathilde Sofie Guldberg (1845-1907), sister of Cato Guldberg.

== Other sources ==
- Bjørn Pedersen (2007) Peter Waage kjemiprofessoren fra Hidra(University of Oslo School Laboratory - Chemistry) ISBN 978-82-91183-07-7

== Publications ==
- Waage, P.; C. M. Guldberg (1864). "Studies Concerning Affinity". Forhandlinger: Videnskabs - Selskabet I Christinia: 35.
- Abrash, Henry I.; Gulberg, C. M. (1986). "Studies Concerning Affinity". Journal of Chemical Education. 63 (12): 1044–1047. Bibcode:1986JChEd..63.1044W. doi:10.1021/ed063p1044.- English translation of Waage and Guldberg's 1864 paper (above)

== Related reading ==
- Peter Østrøm Guldberg and Waage on the Influence of Temperature on the Rates of Chemical Reactions (Centaurus. Volume 28, Issue 3. Pages 277–287. October 1985)
- Robin E. Ferner and Jeffrey K. Aronson Cato Guldberg and Peter Waage, the history of the Law of Mass Action, and its relevance to clinical pharmacology (Br J Clin Pharmacol. 2016 Jan; 81(1): 52–55)

Preceded by Cato Maximilian Guldberg	Chairman of the Norwegian Polytechnic Society; 1868–1869	Succeeded by Cato Maximilian Guldberg
