= Eastman School of Music Student Living Center =

Dormitory tower in downtown Rochester, New York

- Interactive map of the Eastman School of Music Student Living Center area

General information
- Type: Dormitory
- Location: 100 Gibbs Street; Rochester, New York 14605; United States
- Coordinates: 43.159250°N 77.600849°W
- Completed: 1990

Height
- Roof: 213 feet (65 m)

Technical details
- Floor count: 14

Design and construction
- Architects: Herbert S. Newman and Partners

The Eastman School of Music Student Living Center is a residential building that is part of the Eastman School of Music in Rochester, New York.

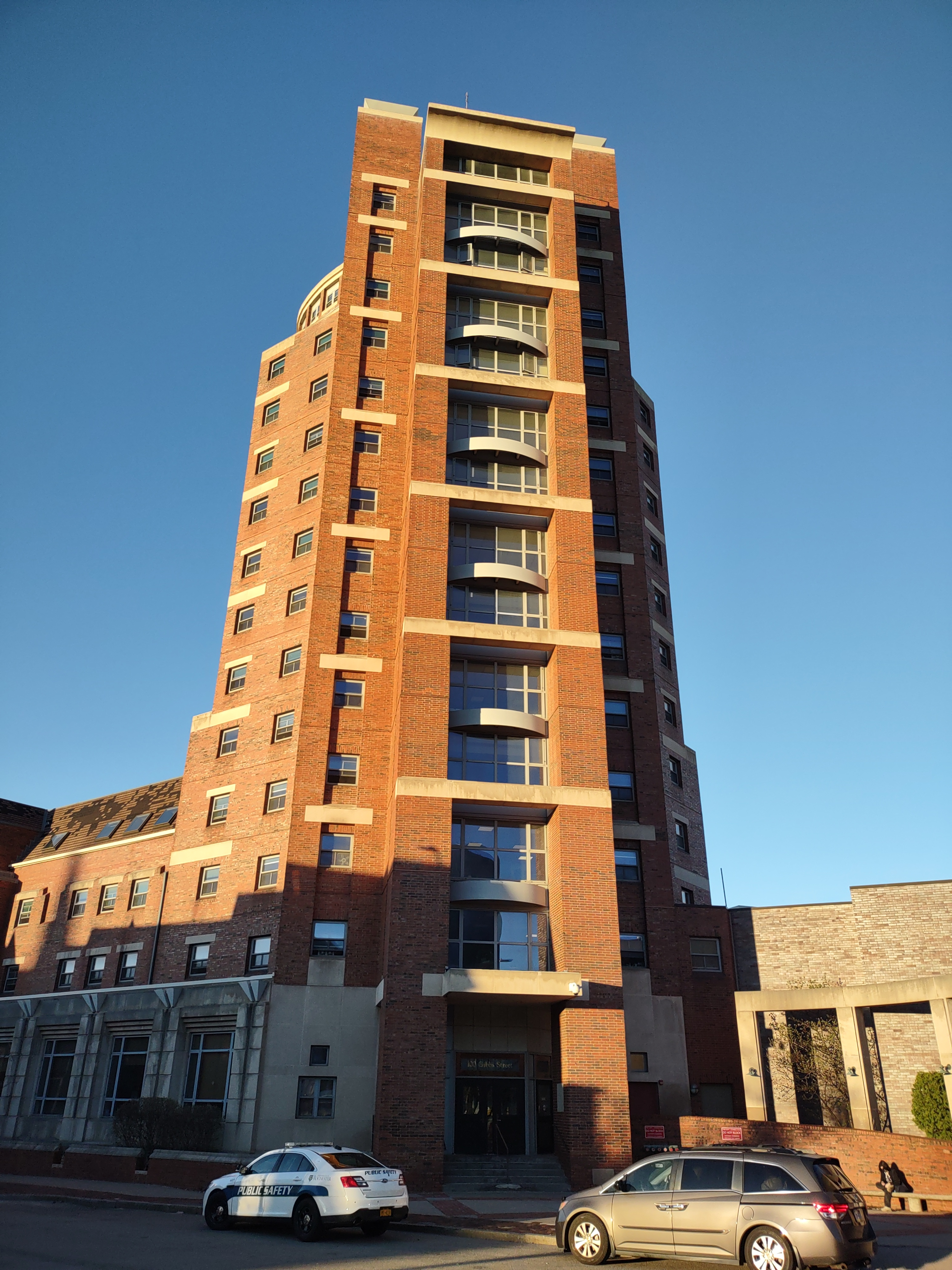
