= Mass–action ratio =

Definition of the mass-action ratio, as used in chemistry

The mass–action ratio, often denoted by $\Gamma$, is the ratio of the product concentrations, p, to reactant concentrations, s. The concentrations may or may not be at equilibrium.

$\Gamma = \frac{ p_1 p_2 \ldots}{ s_1 s_2 \ldots}$

This assumes that the stoichiometric amounts are all unity. If not, then each concentration must be raised to the power of its corresponding stoichiometric amount. If the product and reactant concentrations are at equilibrium then the mass–action ratio will equal the equilibrium constant. At equilibrium:

$\Gamma = K_{eq}$

The ratio of the mass–action ratio to the equilibrium constant is often called the disequilibrium ratio, denoted by the symbol $\rho$.

$\rho = \frac{\Gamma}{K_{eq}}$

and is a useful measure for indicating how far from equilibrium a given reaction is. The ratio is always greater than zero, and at equilibrium, the ratio is one: $\rho = 1$. When the reaction is out of equilibrium, $\rho \neq 1$. When $\rho < 1$, the reaction is out of equilibrium with a forward rate higher than the reverse rate, and the reaction has a negative free energy (i.e., a spontaneous, exergonic reaction), as explained below.

For a uni-molecular reaction such as $A \rightleftharpoons B$, where the net reaction rate is given by the reversible mass-action ratio:

$v = k_1 A - k_2 B = v_f - v_r$

At thermodynamic equilibrium the rate equals zero, that is $0 = k_1 A_{eq} - {k_2 B_{eq}}$. Rearranging gives:

$\frac{k_1}{k_2} = \frac{B_{eq}}{A_{eq}} = K_{eq}$

but $\rho = \frac{\Gamma}{K_{eq}}$, therefore $\rho = \Gamma\frac{k_2}{k_1}$ and therefore $\rho = \frac{B}{A} \frac{k_2}{k_1} = \frac{v_r}{v_f}$

In other words, the disequilibrium ratio is the ratio of the reverse to the forward rate. When the reverse rate, $v_r$ is less than the forward rate, the ratio is less than one, $\rho < 1$, indicating that the net reaction is from left to right.

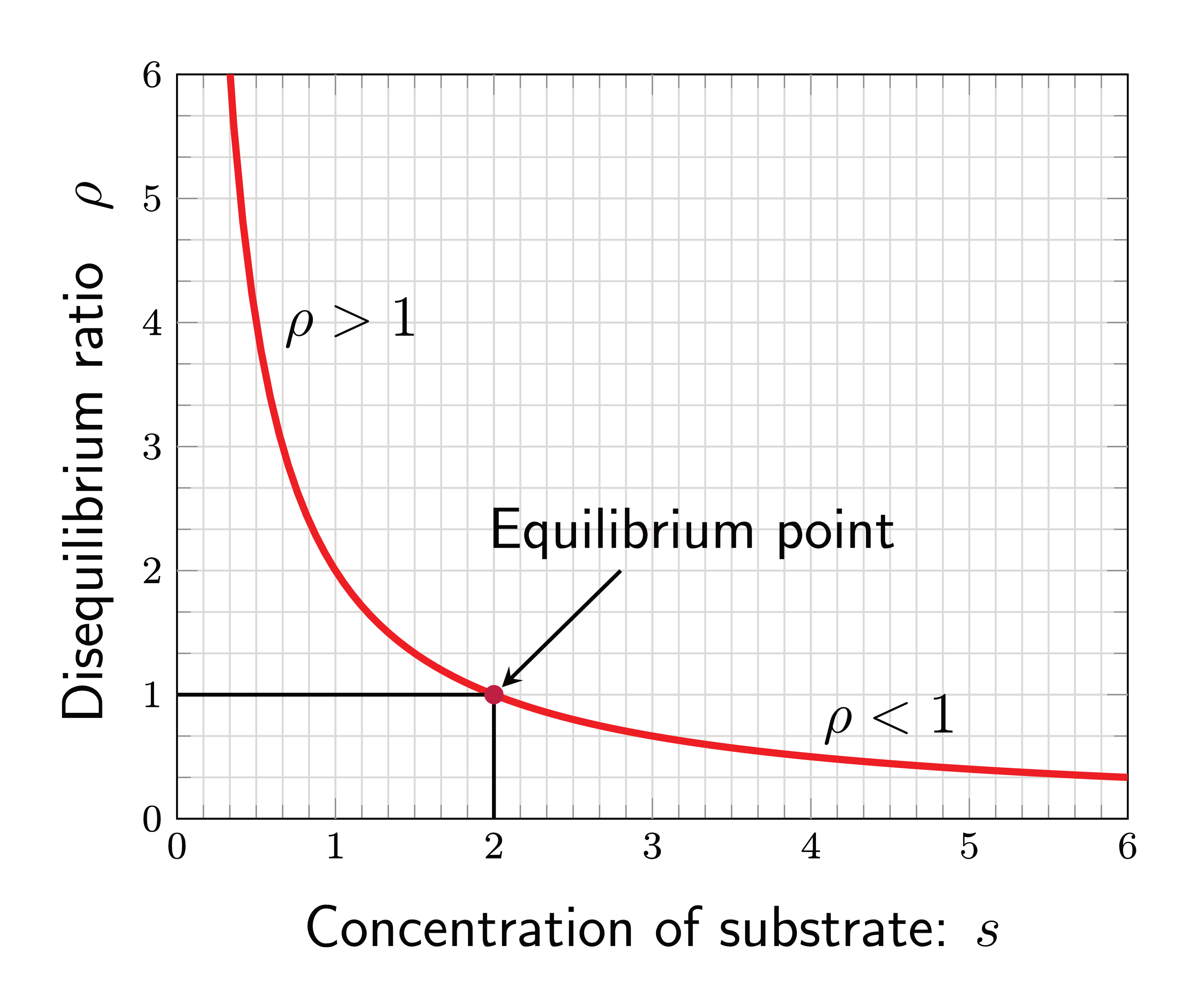
A plot of the disequilibrium ratio as a function of reactant concentration. When the ratio equals one, the reaction is at equilibrium. Product is set to 5 concentration units and the equilibrium constant is set to 2.

== Relationship to Free Energy ==
The thermodynamic equation of the chemical equilibrium states that

$$\Delta_\mathrm{r}G_{T,p}= \Delta_\mathrm{r}G^{\ominus} + RT \ln \Gamma$$

where R is the universal gas constant and T the temperature.

The standard Gibbs free energy, $\Delta_\mathrm{r}G^{\ominus}$, can also be expressed in function of the equilibrium constant:

$\Delta_\mathrm{r}G^{\ominus} = -R T \ln K_{e q}$

Introducing this in the previous equation, one obtains:

$\Delta_\mathrm{r}G_{T,p}= -R T \ln K_{e q} + RT \ln \Gamma$

Substituting the mass-action ratio by the disequilibrium ratio times the equilibrium constant, this leads to:

$\Delta_\mathrm{r}G_{T,p}= -R T \ln K_{e q} + RT \ln (\rho K_{e q})$

Therefore

$\Delta_\mathrm{r}G_{T,p}= -R T \ln K_{e q} + RT \ln (\rho) + RT \ln (K_{e q})$

and

$\Delta_\mathrm{r}G_{T,p}= RT \ln (\rho)$

This shows that the disequilibrium ratio is just an alternative way of expressing the free energy of a reaction and as such gives a more intuitive interpretation of free energy. That is if the free energy for a reaction is less than zero then it indicates that $\rho < 1$ and hence $v_r < v_f$, i.e the net reaction rate is from left to right.

== Other sources ==
- Atkins, P.W. (1978). Physical Chemistry Oxford University Press ISBN 0-7167-3539-3
- Trevor Palmer (2001) Enzymes: biochemistry, biotechnology and clinical chemistry Chichester Horwood Publishing ISBN 1-898563-78-0
