= Thermodynamik chemischer Vorgänge =

1880s papers by Hermann von Helmholtz

In the history of thermodynamics, Thermodynamik chemischer Vorgänge (Chemical thermodynamic process) is a sequence of three papers (1882–1883) written by German physicist Hermann von Helmholtz. It is one of the founding papers in thermodynamics, along with Josiah Willard Gibbs's 1876 paper "On the Equilibrium of Heterogeneous Substances". Together they form the foundation of chemical thermodynamics as well as a large part of physical chemistry.

It was published in three parts in Sitzungsberichte der Königlich Preussischen Akademie der Wissenschaften zu Berlin ["Proceedings of the Royal Prussian Academy of Sciences"], and is available on HathiTrust and online archive of the Sitzungsberichte der Königlich Preussischen Akademie der Wissenschaften zu Berlin.

- First part: Die Thermodynamik chemischer Vorgänge, Submitted on 2 February 1882.
- Second part: Zur Thermodynamik chemischer Vorgänge, subtitled Folgerungen die galvanische Polarisation betreffend ["Conclusions concerning galvanic polarization"]. Submitted on 27 July 1882.
  - (yes, the word "Die" was turned to "Zur", which might cause bibliographical confusion)
- Third part: Zur Thermodynamik chemischer Vorgänge, subtitled Versuche an Chlorzink-Kalomel-Elementen ["Experiments on zinc chloride calomel elements"]. Submitted on 31 May 1883.
