= On the Equilibrium of Heterogeneous Substances =

Paper by Josiah Willard Gibbs

In the history of thermodynamics, "On the Equilibrium of Heterogeneous Substances" is a 300-page paper written by American chemical physicist Willard Gibbs. It is one of the founding papers in thermodynamics, along with German physicist Hermann von Helmholtz's 1882 paper "Thermodynamik chemischer Vorgänge." Together they form the foundation of chemical thermodynamics as well as a large part of physical chemistry.

Gibbs's paper marked the beginning of chemical thermodynamics by integrating chemical, physical, electrical, and electromagnetic phenomena into a coherent system. It introduced concepts such as chemical potential, phase rule, and more, which form the basis for modern physical chemistry. American writer Bill Bryson describes Gibbs's paper as "the Principia of thermodynamics".

"On the Equilibrium of Heterogeneous Substances", was originally published in a relatively obscure American journal, the Transactions of the Connecticut Academy of Arts and Sciences, in several parts, during the years 1875 to 1878 (although most cite "1876" as the key year). It remained largely unknown until translated into German by Wilhelm Ostwald and into French by Henry Louis Le Châtelier.

== Overview ==
Gibbs first contributed to mathematical physics with two papers published in 1873 in the Transactions of the Connecticut Academy of Arts and Sciences on "Graphical Methods in the Thermodynamics of Fluids," and "Method of Geometrical Representation of the Thermodynamic Properties of Substances by means of Surfaces." His subsequent and most important publication was "On the Equilibrium of Heterogeneous Substances" (in two parts, 1876 and 1878). In this monumental, densely woven, 300-page treatise, the first law of thermodynamics, the second law of thermodynamics, the fundamental thermodynamic relation, are applied to the predication and quantification of thermodynamic reaction tendencies in any thermodynamic system in a visual, three-dimensional graphical language of Lagrangian mechanics and phase transitions, among others. As stated by Le Chatelier, it "founded a new department of chemical science that is becoming comparable in importance to that created by [Antoine] Lavoisier." This work was translated into German by Ostwald (who styled its author the "founder of chemical energetics") in 1891 and into French by Le Châtelier in 1899.

Gibbs's Equilibrium paper is considered one of the greatest achievements in physical science in the 19th century and one of the foundations of the science of physical chemistry. In these papers Gibbs applied thermodynamics to the interpretation of physicochemical phenomena and showed the explanation and interrelationship of what had been known only as isolated, inexplicable facts.

Gibbs' papers on heterogeneous equilibria included:

- Some chemical potential concepts
- Some free energy concepts
- A Gibbsian ensemble ideal (basis of the statistical mechanics field)
- the phase rule
