= Polytechnic Society (Norway) =

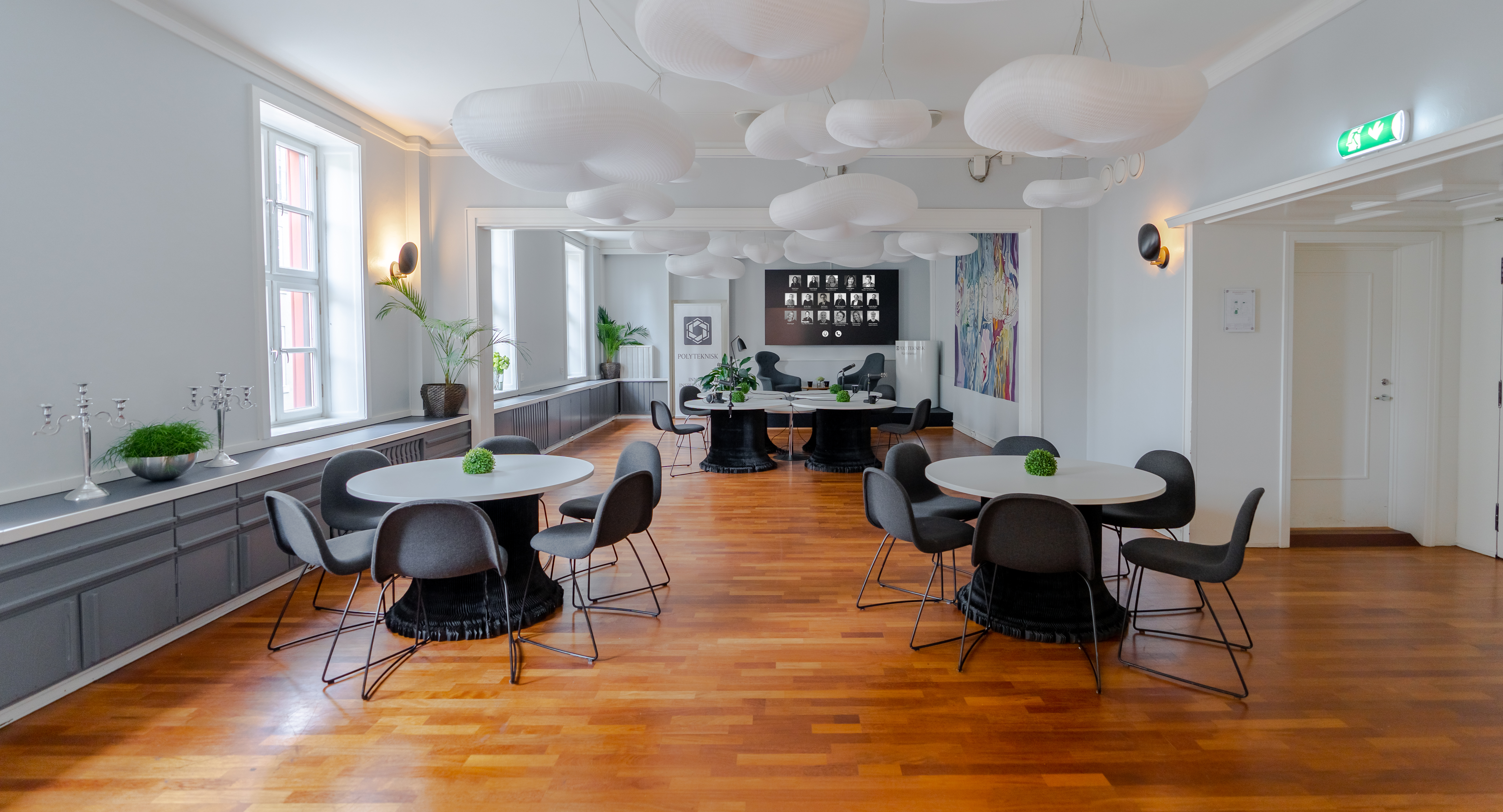

The Polytechnic Society (Norwegian: Polyteknisk Forening) is a Norwegian member network that inspires a science-based and sustainable development, through technology and interdisciplinary partnerships. It was founded in 1852 in Christiania (now: Oslo). The organisation was originally a members club gathering people with ambitions to influence the development of natural sciences, technology and modern industry.

The Polytechnic Society published a periodical, Polyteknisk Tidsskrift ("Polytechnic Journal"), from 1854. The periodical was merged with Teknisk Ukeblad in 1883.

The Polytechnic Society is independent, interdisciplinary and non-commercial, with 2,000 private, corporate and organizational members, 6,000 subscribers to newsletters and followers in social media as well as 4,000 listeners to the podcast #PolyPod. The organisation is funded by its members. HM The King Harald and HRH the Crown Prince Haakon are honorary members, and HM The King grants the Polytechnic Society's president and Secretary-General audience at the Royal Palace twice a year.

== Activities ==
The activity of the Polytechnic Society are based on knowledge sharing, and include physical seminars, roundtables and other networking events that take place in Rosenkrantz' gate 7 in Oslo. The activities are organised by a number of professional networks in the organisation, addressing a range of topics within technology and society. The activities are free for members, and non-members pay a fee.

=== Digital activities ===
The Polytechnic Society also organises digital meetings (webinars). These are available free for members, and for non-members that pay a fee. In addition, the society publishes the podcast #PolyPod, which is available online for both members and non-members.

== Structure ==
=== The Board ===
The supreme body of the Polytechnic Society is the Board. The Board consists of the President Silvija Seres, Vice President Ingrid Stange, and board members Hans M. Borchgrevink, Alfhild Skogsfjord, Kristin Vinje, Egil Boyum, Fredrik Winther and Nils Øveraas.

=== Secretary General ===
Mette Vågnes Eriksen is the Secretary General and the general manager of the Polytechnic Society.

=== The Election Committee ===
The Election Committee makes recommendations for members of the Board and the management board, and consists of Ingvild Myhre (chair), Fredrik Evjen, Hilde Nagell and Hege Marie Norheim. The Board, The management board and the Election Committee is appointed by the General Assembly.

=== The Management Board ===
The management board is the advisory body of the Polytechnic Society. It consists of 50 representatives from business, civil society and academia, including all chairs of the professional networks.

=== Professional Networks ===
The Polytechnic Society offers a range of professional networks for specific subject matters, in which each one of them is governed by a boardappointed by the members of the network. Members of the Polytechnic Society have access to all the activities organized by all the networks.

==== The professional networks ====
- PF Civil Protection
- PF CO_{2} management
- PF Corporate Governance
- PF Culture
- PF Digital Leadership
- PF Economics
- PF Energy
- PF Health
- PF International Politics and Economics
- PF Materials Science
- PF Petroleum and Renewables
- PF Senior
- PF Sustainability
- PF Transport
