= List of years in science =

The following entries cover events related to science or technology which occurred in the listed year.

== Before 1500s ==
- 0s: 1st century in science
- 100s: 2nd century in science
- 200s: 3rd century in science
- 300s: 4th century in science
- 400s: 5th century in science
- 500s: 6th century in science
- 600s: 7th century in science
- 700s: 8th century in science
- 800s: 9th century in science
- 900s: 10th century in science
- 1000s: 11th century in science
- 1100s: 12th century in science
- 1200s: 13th century in science
- 1300s: 14th century in science
- 1400s: 15th century in science

== 1500s ==
1500s: 1500 1501 1502 1503 1504 1505 1506 1507 1508 1509
1510s: 1510 1511 1512 1513 1514 1515 1516 1517 1518 1519
1520s: 1520 1521 1522 1523 1524 1525 1526 1527 1528 1529
1530s: 1530 1531 1532 1533 1534 1535 1536 1537 1538 1539
1540s: 1540 1541 1542 1543 1544 1545 1546 1547 1548 1549
1550s: 1550 1551 1552 1553 1554 1555 1556 1557 1558 1559
1560s: 1560 1561 1562 1563 1564 1565 1566 1567 1568 1569
1570s: 1570 1571 1572 1573 1574 1575 1576 1577 1578 1579
1580s: 1580 1581 1582 1583 1584 1585 1586 1587 1588 1589
1590s: 1590 1591 1592 1593 1594 1595 1596 1597 1598 1599

== 1600s ==
1600s: 1600 1601 1602 1603 1604 1605 1606 1607 1608 1609
1610s: 1610 1611 1612 1613 1614 1615 1616 1617 1618 1619
1620s: 1620 1621 1622 1623 1624 1625 1626 1627 1628 1629
1630s: 1630 1631 1632 1633 1634 1635 1636 1637 1638 1639
1640s: 1640 1641 1642 1643 1644 1645 1646 1647 1648 1649
1650s: 1650 1651 1652 1653 1654 1655 1656 1657 1658 1659
1660s: 1660 1661 1662 1663 1664 1665 1666 1667 1668 1669
1670s: 1670 1671 1672 1673 1674 1675 1676 1677 1678 1679
1680s: 1680 1681 1682 1683 1684 1685 1686 1687 1688 1689
1690s: 1690 1691 1692 1693 1694 1695 1696 1697 1698 1699

== 1700s ==
1700s: 1700 1701 1702 1703 1704 1705 1706 1707 1708 1709
1710s: 1710 1711 1712 1713 1714 1715 1716 1717 1718 1719
1720s: 1720 1721 1722 1723 1724 1725 1726 1727 1728 1729
1730s: 1730 1731 1732 1733 1734 1735 1736 1737 1738 1739
1740s: 1740 1741 1742 1743 1744 1745 1746 1747 1748 1749
1750s: 1750 1751 1752 1753 1754 1755 1756 1757 1758 1759
1760s: 1760 1761 1762 1763 1764 1765 1766 1767 1768 1769
1770s: 1770 1771 1772 1773 1774 1775 1776 1777 1778 1779
1780s: 1780 1781 1782 1783 1784 1785 1786 1787 1788 1789
1790s: 1790 1791 1792 1793 1794 1795 1796 1797 1798 1799

== 1800s ==
1800s: 1800 1801 1802 1803 1804 1805 1806 1807 1808 1809
1810s: 1810 1811 1812 1813 1814 1815 1816 1817 1818 1819
1820s: 1820 1821 1822 1823 1824 1825 1826 1827 1828 1829
1830s: 1830 1831 1832 1833 1834 1835 1836 1837 1838 1839
1840s: 1840 1841 1842 1843 1844 1845 1846 1847 1848 1849
1850s: 1850 1851 1852 1853 1854 1855 1856 1857 1858 1859
1860s: 1860 1861 1862 1863 1864 1865 1866 1867 1868 1869
1870s: 1870 1871 1872 1873 1874 1875 1876 1877 1878 1879
1880s: 1880 1881 1882 1883 1884 1885 1886 1887 1888 1889
1890s: 1890 1891 1892 1893 1894 1895 1896 1897 1898 1899

== 1900s ==
1900s: 1900 1901 1902 1903 1904 1905 1906 1907 1908 1909
1910s: 1910 1911 1912 1913 1914 1915 1916 1917 1918 1919
1920s: 1920 1921 1922 1923 1924 1925 1926 1927 1928 1929
1930s: 1930 1931 1932 1933 1934 1935 1936 1937 1938 1939
1940s: 1940 1941 1942 1943 1944 1945 1946 1947 1948 1949
1950s: 1950 1951 1952 1953 1954 1955 1956 1957 1958 1959
1960s: 1960 1961 1962 1963 1964 1965 1966 1967 1968 1969
1970s: 1970 1971 1972 1973 1974 1975 1976 1977 1978 1979
1980s: 1980 1981 1982 1983 1984 1985 1986 1987 1988 1989
1990s: 1990 1991 1992 1993 1994 1995 1996 1997 1998 1999

== 2000s ==
2000s: 2000 2001 2002 2003 2004 2005 2006 2007 2008 2009
2010s: 2010 2011 2012 2013 2014 2015 2016 2017 2018 2019
2020s: 2020 2021 2022 2023 2024 2025 2026

== See also ==
- List of years in literature
- List of years in philosophy
- Timeline of scientific discoveries
- Timeline of sociology
