= 1578 in science =

List of years in science	(table)
- … 1568; 1569; 1570; 1571; 1572; 1573; 1574; 1575; 1576; 1577; 1578; 1579; 1580; 1581; 1582; 1583; 1584; 1585; 1586; 1587; 1588 …
- Art; Archaeology; Architecture; Literature; Music; Philosophy; Science; +...

The year 1578 in science and technology included a number of events, some of which are listed here.

== Archaeology ==
- Catacombs of Rome rediscovered.

== Medicine ==
- Cristóbal Acosta publishes a study of Indian pharmacology, Tractado de las drogas y medicinas de las Indias orientales, in Burgos.
- Roch Le Baillif publishes Le Demosterion de Roch le Baillif, edelphe medecin spagiric, auquel sont contenuz trois cens Aphorismes latins et français. Sommaire véritable de la médecine Paracelsique, extraicte de luy en la plus part par ledict Baillif in Rennes.
- Li Shizhen completes the first draft of the materia medica Bencao Gangmu.

== Technology ==
- English seaman William Bourne publishes a manual, Inventions or Devises, Very Necessary for all Generalles and Captaines, as wel by Sea as by Land, including an early theoretical description of a submarine.

== Births ==
- April 1 – William Harvey, English physician (died 1657)
- Benedetto Castelli, Italian mathematician (died 1643)
- Adriaan van den Spiegel, Flemish-born anatomist and botanist (died 1625)
- approx. date:
  - Jean de Chastelet, Brabantian mining engineer (died c. 1645)
  - Philippe d'Aquin, French physician, hebraist, philologist and orientalist (died 1650)

== Deaths ==
- August 11 – Pedro Nunes, Portuguese mathematician (born 1502)
- Cornelius Gemma of Louvain, physician and astronomer (born 1535)
