= 1584 in science =

List of years in science	(table)
- … 1574; 1575; 1576; 1577; 1578; 1579; 1580; 1581; 1582; 1583; 1584; 1585; 1586; 1587; 1588; 1589; 1590; 1591; 1592; 1593; 1594 …
- Art; Archaeology; Architecture; Literature; Music; Philosophy; Science; +...

The year 1584 in science and technology included many events, some of which are listed here.

== Astronomy ==
- Completion of Tycho Brahe's subterranean observatory at Stjerneborg.
- Giordano Bruno, in England, publishes his "Italian Dialogues", including the cosmological tracts La Cena de le Ceneri ("The Ash Wednesday Supper"), De la Causa, Principio et Uno ("On Cause, Principle and Unity") and De l'Infinito Universo et Mondi ("On the Infinite Universe and Worlds").

== Cartography ==
- Lucas Janszoon Waghenaer publishes the first atlas of nautical charts, Spieghel der zeevaerdt (Mariner's Mirror).
- The Italian Jesuit Matteo Ricci, in Zhaoqing, produces the first Chinese world map, on wood, Yudi Shanhai Quantu (舆地山海全图).
- Abraham Ortelius publishes Itinerarium per nonnullas Galliæ Belgicæ partes in Antwerp.

== Exploration ==
- June 4 – Walter Ralegh sends Philip Amadas and Arthur Barlowe to explore the Outer Banks of Virginia (now North Carolina), with a view to establishing an English colony; they locate Roanoke Island.

== Mathematics ==
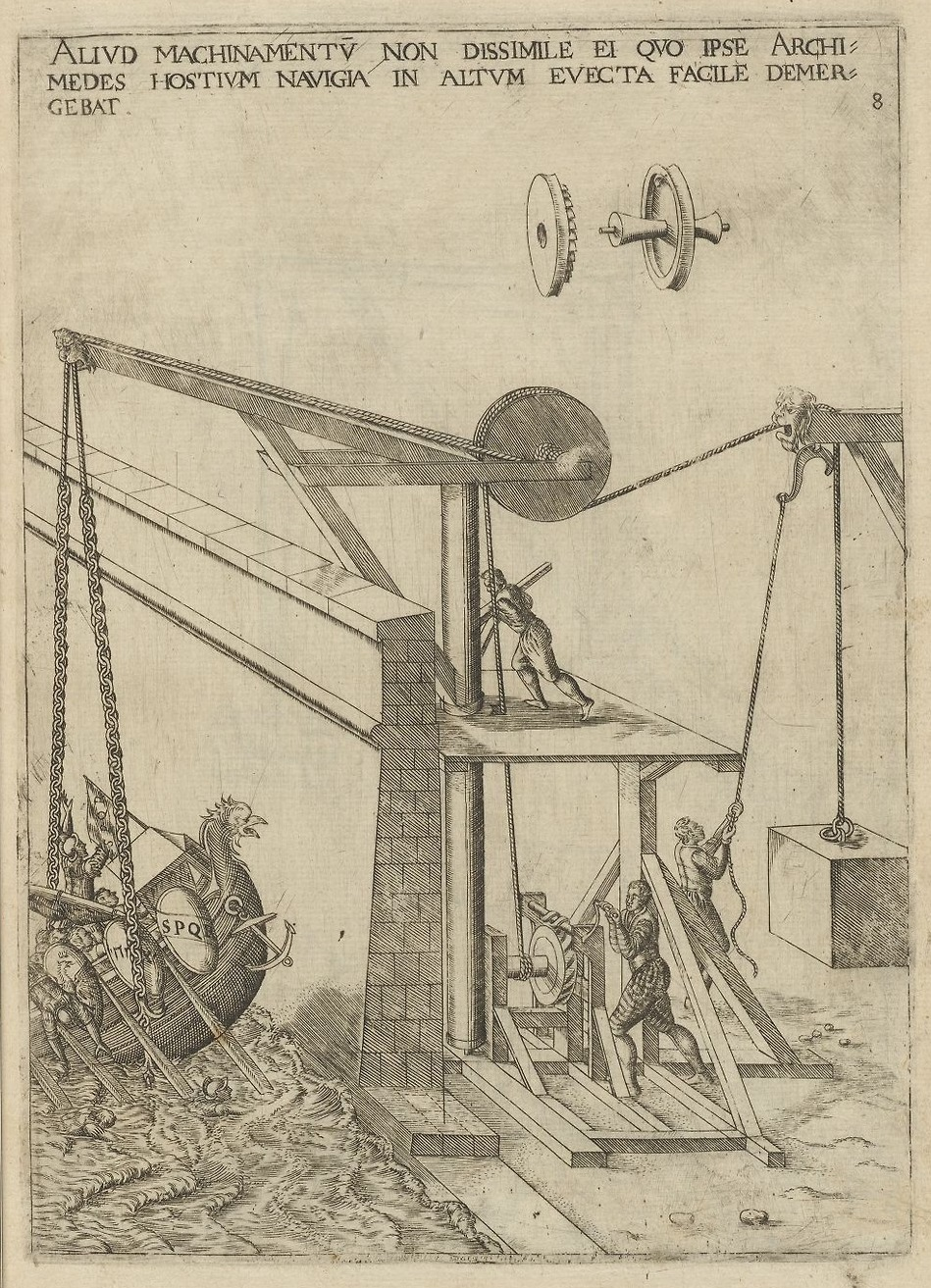
Instruments mathematiques mechaniques (1584) by Jean Errard

- Jean Errard publishes Premier livre des instruments mathématiques at Nancy.
- Fabrizio Mordente publishes Il Signor del Compasso Fabritio Mordente. Con altri istromenti mathematici, suo fratello Gasparo da ritrovati at Antwerp and introduces the parallel rulers.
- Zhu Zaiyu calculates equal temperament.

== Medicine ==
- Jacques Guillemeau publishes his ophthalmology textbook Traite des maladies de l'oeil.
- Thomas Muffet publishes De jure et praestantia chemicorum medicamentorum.

== Technology ==
- March 12 – Louis de Foix begins construction of Cordouan lighthouse on the Gironde estuary.
- Jost Bürgi invents the cross-beat escapement for clocks.

== Other events ==
- Nikola Vitov Gučetić publishes Sopra le Metheore d' Aristotile giving explanations for the causes of winds and of the movement of air in caves.

== Births ==
- March 22? – Grégoire de Saint-Vincent, Flemish mathematician (died 1667)
- William Baffin, English explorer (died 1622)
- Giovanni Baptista Ferrari, Italian botanist and linguist (died 1655)
- Walter Rumsey, Welsh judge and amateur scientist (died 1660)

== Deaths ==
- June 13 – János Zsámboky, Hungarian physician and scholar (born 1531)
- July 12 – Steven Borough, English explorer (born 1525)
- Simon Baudichon, French physician
