= 1574 in science =

List of years in science	(table)
- … 1564; 1565; 1566; 1567; 1568; 1569; 1570; 1571; 1572; 1573; 1574; 1575; 1576; 1577; 1578; 1579; 1580; 1581; 1582; 1583; 1584 …
- Art; Archaeology; Architecture; Literature; Music; Philosophy; Science; +...

The year 1574 in science and technology involved some significant events.

== Archaeology ==
- In Rome (Italy), in the river Tiber between the two bridges, the monument base is discovered for a statue of Simon Paeter (or Simon the Sorcerer, the "Magus of Samaria"), with inscription "Simoni Deo Sancto" (translation: "To Simon the Holy God").

== Exploration ==
- November 22 – Juan Fernández, a Portuguese navigator, discovers, along the coast of Chile, the Juan Fernández Islands, where later shipwreck survivor Alexander Selkirk (the real figure behind Defoe's "Robinson Crusoe") will live for four years. The Juan Fernández fur seal is discovered and named.
- English seaman William Bourne produces a popular expanded version of Martín Cortés de Albacar's navigation manual Arte de Navegar entitled A Regiment for the Sea.

== Mineralogy ==
- The Charcas Mineral District in the state of San Luis Potosí (New Spain, later Mexico) is discovered for the mining of lead, zinc, copper, and silver.
- Publication of Lazarus Ercker's textbook Beschreibung allerfürnemisten mineralischen Ertzt und Berckwercksarten ("Description of Leading Ore Processing and Mining Methods") in Prague.

== Births ==
- March 5 – William Oughtred, English mathematician, inventor of the slide rule (died 1660)
- August 7 – Robert Dudley, English navigator (died 1649)
- October 27 (bapt.) – Simon Baskerville, English physician (died 1641)

== Deaths ==
- January 26 – Martin Helwig, Silesian cartographer (born 1516)
- August 27 – Bartolomeo Eustachi, Italian anatomist (born 1500 or 1514)
- October 4 - Johann Winter von Andernach, German Renaissance physician (born 1505)
