= 1579 in science =

List of years in science	(table)
- … 1569; 1570; 1571; 1572; 1573; 1574; 1575; 1576; 1577; 1578; 1579; 1580; 1581; 1582; 1583; 1584; 1585; 1586; 1587; 1588; 1589 …
- Art; Archaeology; Architecture; Literature; Music; Philosophy; Science; +...

The year 1579 in science and technology included a number of events, some of which are listed here.

== Exploration ==
- June 17 – Francis Drake, during his circumnavigation of the world, lands in what is now California, which he claims for Queen Elizabeth I of England as Nova Albion.

== Physiology and medicine ==
- Hieronymus Fabricius discovers the membranous folds that serve as valves in the veins.

== Births ==
- January 12 (bapt.) – Jan Baptist van Helmont, Flemish chemist (died 1644)
- July 13 – Arthur Dee, English physician and alchemist (died 1651)

== Deaths ==
- June 17 – Johannes Stadius, Flemish mathematician and astronomer (born c. 1527)
- approx. date – Hans Staden, German adventurer (born c. 1525)
