= 1580 in science =

| List of years in science | (table) |
- … 1570; 1571; 1572; 1573; 1574; 1575; 1576; 1577; 1578; 1579; 1580; 1581; 1582; 1583; 1584; 1585; 1586; 1587; 1588; 1589; 1590 …
- Art; Archaeology; Architecture; Literature; Music; Philosophy; Science; +...

The year 1580 in science and technology included many events, some of which are listed here.

== Astronomy ==
- The Constantinople Observatory of Taqi ad-Din is destroyed by Sultan Selim II.

== Exploration ==
- September 26 – Francis Drake in the Golden Hind sails into Plymouth having completed the second circumnavigation of the world, westabout, begun in 1577.

== Medicine ==
- Severe outbreak of smallpox in Venezuela: it strikes the Caracas and other Indians in the North and greatly weakens Indian resistance to the Spanish colonizing of the region.

== Geology ==
- April 6 – Dover Straits earthquake.

== Births ==
- January 12 – Jan Baptist van Helmont, Flemish chemist (died 1644)
- December 1 – Nicolas-Claude Fabri de Peiresc, French astronomer (died 1637)
- Peter Crüger, German polymath (died 1639)
- Willebrord Snellius, Dutch mathematician and physicist who devised the basic law of refraction, Snell's law (died 1626)

== Deaths ==
- May 3 – Thomas Tusser, English chorister and agriculturalist (born c. 1524)
- September 15 – Friedrich Risner, German mathematician (born c. 1533)
- Giovanni Filippo Ingrassia, Sicilian anatomist (born 1510).
