= 1513 in science =

List of years in science	(table)
- … 1503; 1504; 1505; 1506; 1507; 1508; 1509; 1510; 1511; 1512; 1513; 1514; 1515; 1516; 1517; 1518; 1519; 1520; 1521; 1522; 1523 …
- Art; Archaeology; Architecture; Literature; Music; Philosophy; Science; +...

The year 1513 in science and technology included a number of events, some of which are listed here.

== Exploration and cartography ==
- March 27 – Juan Ponce de León becomes the first European definitely known to sight the modern-day territory of the United States, specifically Florida, mistaking it for another island. His expedition lands on April 2.
- May – Portuguese explorer Jorge Álvares lands on Lintin Island in the Pearl River estuary.
- September 26 – Vasco Núñez de Balboa, "silent upon a peak in Darién", first sees what will become known as the Pacific Ocean.
- Portuguese land on Ambon Island.
- Piri Reis map compiled.
- Publication in Oppenheim of Johannes Stöffler's treatise on the construction and use of astrolabes, Elucidatio fabricae ususque astrolabii.

== Physiology and medicine ==
- Eucharius Rösslin publishes Der Rosengarten, an obstetrics manual primarily for midwives written in German which will be widely translated and circulated in Europe.

== Births ==
- Jacques Daléchamps, French physician and botanist (died 1588)

== Deaths ==
- Ibn Ghazi al-Miknasi, Moroccan scholar and mathematician (born 1437)
- Hua Sui, Chinese pioneer of metal movable type printing (born 1439)
