= 1575 in science =

List of years in science	(table)
- … 1565; 1566; 1567; 1568; 1569; 1570; 1571; 1572; 1573; 1574; 1575; 1576; 1577; 1578; 1579; 1580; 1581; 1582; 1583; 1584; 1585 …
- Art; Archaeology; Architecture; Literature; Music; Philosophy; Science; +...

The year 1575 in science and technology included a number of events, some of which are listed here.

== Events ==
- Leiden University is founded.

== Astronomy ==
- Cornelius Gemma is credited with publishing the first scientific illustration of the aurora, in his discussion of the 1572 supernova.

== Geology ==
- December 16 – Valdivia earthquake in Chile.

== Mathematics ==
- Guilielmus Xylander uses parallel vertical lines to indicate equality.

== Medicine ==
- First publication of Ambroise Paré's collected works, Les oeuvres de M. Ambroise Paré, in Paris, including some of the earliest descriptions of forensic medicine.

== Publications ==
- Cornelius Gemma publishes De naturae divinis characterismis in Antwerp.

== Deaths ==
- Tomás de Mercado, Spanish economist and theologian (born 1525)
- Costanzo Varolio, Italian anatomist and a papal physician to Gregory XIII (born 1543)
