= 1583 in science =

List of years in science	(table)
- … 1573; 1574; 1575; 1576; 1577; 1578; 1579; 1580; 1581; 1582; 1583; 1584; 1585; 1586; 1587; 1588; 1589; 1590; 1591; 1592; 1593 …
- Art; Archaeology; Architecture; Literature; Music; Philosophy; Science; +...

The year 1583 in science and technology included a number of events, some of which are listed here.

== Botany ==
- Carolus Clusius publishes Rariorum stirpium per Pannonias observatorum Historiae, the earliest book on Alpine flora.

== Mathematics ==
- Thomas Fincke's Geometria rotundi is published, introducing the terms tangent and secant for trigonometric functions.
- Johann Thomas Freigius' Quaestiones geometricae et stereometricae Euclidis is published in Basel following his death (January 16) from plague.

== Physiology and medicine ==
- Georg Bartisch's Ophthalmodouleia, Das ist Augendienst is published in Dresden, the first modern work on ophthalmology.

== Births ==
- February 23 – Jean-Baptiste Morin, French mathematician, astronomer, and astrologer (died 1656)

== Deaths ==
- December 31 – Thomas Erastus, Swiss physician and theologian (born 1524)
