= 1512 in science =

List of years in science	(table)
- … 1502; 1503; 1504; 1505; 1506; 1507; 1508; 1509; 1510; 1511; 1512; 1513; 1514; 1515; 1516; 1517; 1518; 1519; 1520; 1521; 1522 …
- Art; Archaeology; Architecture; Literature; Music; Philosophy; Science; +...

The year 1512 in science and technology included a number of events, some of which are listed here.

== Astronomy ==
- Possible date – Nicolaus Copernicus begins to write Commentariolus, an abstract of what will eventually become De revolutionibus orbium coelestium; he sends it to other scientists interested in the matter by 1514.

== Exploration ==
- António de Abreu discovers Timor island and reaches the Banda Islands and Seram.
- Francisco Serrão reaches the Moluccas.
- Juan Ponce de León discovers the Turks and Caicos Islands.
- Pedro Mascarenhas discovers Diego Garcia and reaches Mauritius in the Mascarene Islands.

== Pharmaceutics ==
- Hieronymus Brunschwygk's Big Book (of Distillation) describes medicinal herbs and the construction of stills for processing them.

== Technology ==
- Martin Waldseemüller (of the Rhineland) produces and describes the first theodolite (which he calls the polimetrum).

== Births ==
- March 5 – Gerardus Mercator, Flemish cartographer (died 1594)
- approx. date – Robert Recorde, Welsh-born mathematician and physician (died 1558)

== Deaths ==
- February 22 – Amerigo Vespucci, Italian explorer (born 1454)
- August 2 – Alessandro Achillini, Italian anatomist (born 1463)
- September 29 – Johannes Engel, German astronomer and physician (born 1453)
