= 1515 in science =

List of years in science	(table)
- … 1505; 1506; 1507; 1508; 1509; 1510; 1511; 1512; 1513; 1514; 1515; 1516; 1517; 1518; 1519; 1520; 1521; 1522; 1523; 1524; 1525 …
- Art; Archaeology; Architecture; Literature; Music; Philosophy; Science; +...

The year 1515 in science and technology included many events, some of which are listed here.

== Astronomy ==
- A year in which Earth's so-called "second moon" Cruithne (discovered in 1986) makes a closest approach to earth. The two are in 1:1 orbital resonance. This next happens about 1903; the following occasion will be in July 2292.

== Cartography ==
- First Johannes Schöner globe produced.

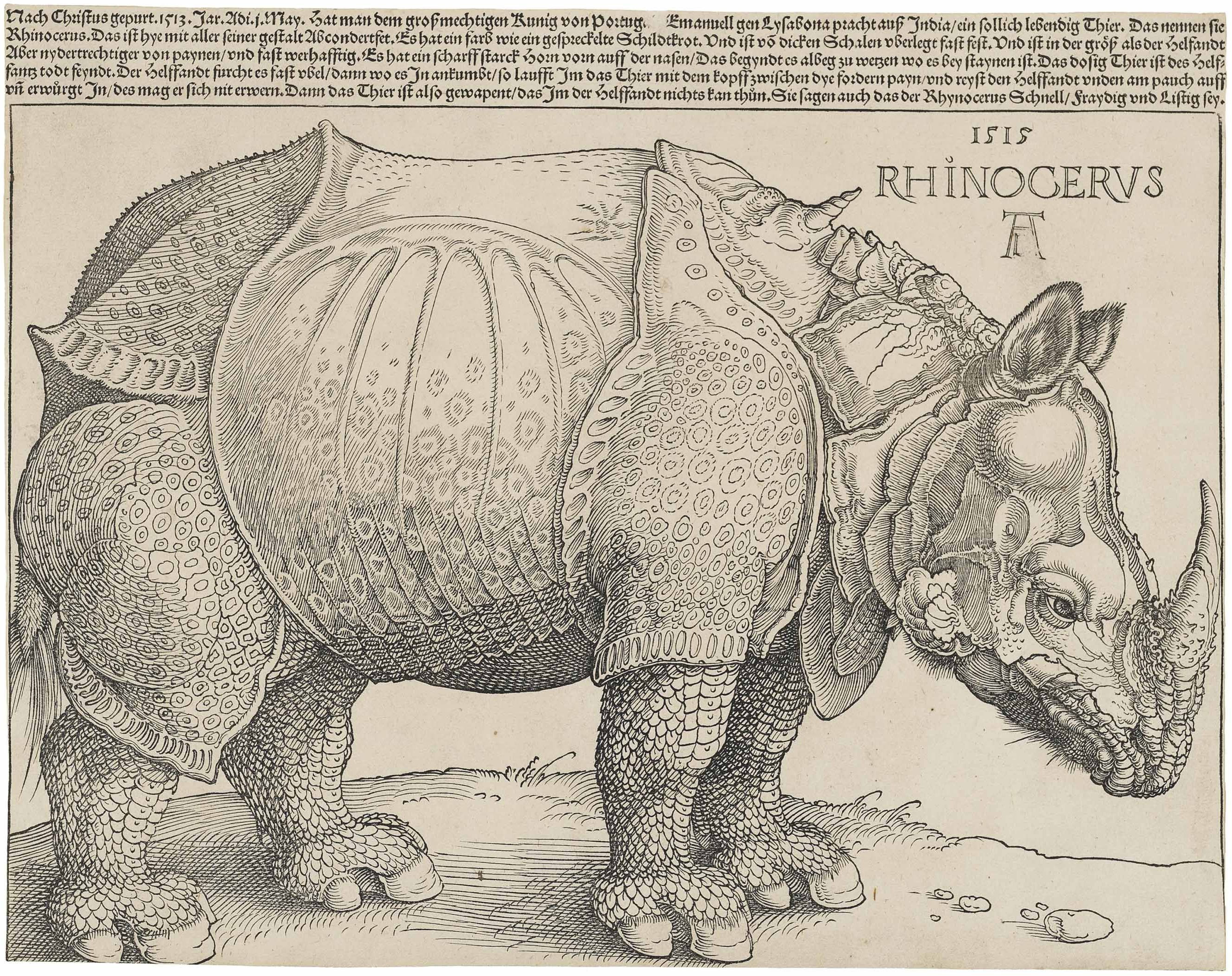
Dürer's Rhinoceros (1515)

== Zoology ==
- May 15 – An Indian rhinoceros arrives in Lisbon, the first to be seen in Europe since Roman times.

== Births ==
- February 18 – Valerius Cordus, German physician and botanist (died 1544)
- Cristóbal Acosta, Portuguese physician and natural historian (died 1594)
- Giorgio Biandrata, Italian court physician (died 1588)
- Petrus Ramus, French logician (k. 1572)
- Johann Weyer, Dutch] physician and occultist (died 1588)
- approx. date – Leonard Digges, English mathematician and surveyor (d. c.1559)

== Deaths ==
- Alonso de Ojeda, Spanish navigator (born c.1466)
- Andreas Stoberl, Austrian astronomer, mathematician and theologian (born 1465)
