= 1509 in science =

List of years in science	(table)
- … 1499; 1500; 1501; 1502; 1503; 1504; 1505; 1506; 1507; 1508; 1509; 1510; 1511; 1512; 1513; 1514; 1515; 1516; 1517; 1518; 1519 …
- Art; Archaeology; Architecture; Literature; Music; Philosophy; Science; +...

The year 1509 in science and technology included many events, some of which are listed here.

== Exploration ==
- September 11 – Diogo Lopes de Sequeira reaches Malacca, having crossed the Gulf of Bengal.

== Geology ==
- September 10 – Constantinople earthquake.

== Mathematics ==
- June 11 – Luca Pacioli's De divina proportione, concerning the golden ratio, is published in Venice, with illustrations by Leonardo da Vinci.

== Births ==
- Bernardino Telesio, Italian philosopher and natural scientist (died 1588)
- possible date – Guillaume Le Testu, French privateer, explorer and cartographer (k. 1573)

== Deaths ==
- Juan de la Cosa, Spanish explorer and cartographer (b. c. 1460)
