= 1507 in science =

List of years in science	(table)
- … 1497; 1498; 1499; 1500; 1501; 1502; 1503; 1504; 1505; 1506; 1507; 1508; 1509; 1510; 1511; 1512; 1513; 1514; 1515; 1516; 1517 …
- Art; Archaeology; Architecture; Literature; Music; Philosophy; Science; +...

The year 1507 in science and technology included many events, some of which are listed here.

== Cartography ==
- April 25 – Martin Waldseemüller publishes Cosmographiae Introductio ("Introduction to Universal Cosmography", probably written by Matthias Ringmann) and accompanying wall map, the first to show and name the Americas as a separate continent.
- Johannes Ruysch's map of the world is first published in editions of Ptolemy's Geography produced in Rome.

== Births ==
- September 27 – Guillaume Rondelet, French physician (died 1566)

== Deaths ==
- July 29 – Martin Behaim, German navigator and geographer (born 1459)
