= 1505 in science =

List of years in science	(table)
- … 1495; 1496; 1497; 1498; 1499; 1500; 1501; 1502; 1503; 1504; 1505; 1506; 1507; 1508; 1509; 1510; 1511; 1512; 1513; 1514; 1515 …
- Art; Archaeology; Architecture; Literature; Music; Philosophy; Science; +...

The year 1505 in science and technology included a number of events, some of which are listed below.

== Biology ==
- approx. date – Leonardo da Vinci produces his Codex on the Flight of Birds.

== Exploration ==
- Portuguese reach the Comoros archipelago.
- Bermuda is discovered by Spanish explorer Juan de Bermúdez.
- 1505 or 1506 – Portuguese explorer Gonçalo Álvares is the first to sight what will later be known as Gough Island.

== Mathematics ==
- Scipione del Ferro solves the depressed cubic equation.

== Mineralogy ==
- Ulrich Rülein von Calw publishes Eyn wohlgeordnet und nützlich Büchlein, wie man bergwerk suchen und finden Soll ("A well-ordered and useful little book about how to seek and find mines") in Augsburg, the first scientific treatment of mining in Germany.

== Technology ==
- First known reference to a wheellock gun.

== Births ==
- May 20 – Levinus Lemnius, Dutch physician (d. 1568)
- Giovan Battista Bellaso, Italian cryptologist

== Deaths ==
- Gabriele Zerbi, Veronese gerontologist (b. 1445; sawn in half by disaffected sons of a deceased patient)
