= 1588 in science =

List of years in science	(table)
- … 1578; 1579; 1580; 1581; 1582; 1583; 1584; 1585; 1586; 1587; 1588; 1589; 1590; 1591; 1592; 1593; 1594; 1595; 1596; 1597; 1598 …
- Art; Archaeology; Architecture; Literature; Music; Philosophy; Science; +...

The year 1588 in science and technology, Armada year, included a number of events, some of which are listed here.

== Astronomy ==
- Tycho Brahe publishes De mundi aetheri recentioribus phaenomenis in Uraniborg.
- Giovanni Paolo Gallucci publishes his star atlas Theatrum Mundi et Temporis (Theater of the world and time).

== History of science ==
- October 7 – The first biography of Nicolaus Copernicus (died 1543) is completed by Bernardino Baldi.

== Mathematics ==
- Pietro Cataldi discovers the sixth and seventh Mersenne primes by this year.
- Giovanni Antonio Magini is chosen over Galileo to occupy the chair of mathematics at the University of Bologna after the death of Egnatio Danti.
- Ferdinando I de Medici, Grand Duke of Tuscany, appoints Galileo to the professorship of mathematics at the University of Pisa.

== Medicine ==
- Joachim Camerarius the younger publishes Hortus medicus.
- Thomas Muffet publishes Nosomantica Hippocratea.

== Technology ==
- Agostino Ramelli publishes Le diverse et artificiose Machine del Capitano Agostino Ramelli, Dal Ponte Della Tresia Ingegniero del Christianissimo Re di Francia et di Pollonia in Paris.

== Births ==
- May 2 – Étienne Pascal, French mathematician (died 1651)
- May 13 – Ole Worm, Danish physician, natural historian and antiquary (died 1655)
- September 8 – Marin Mersenne, French mathematician (died 1648)
- December 10 – Isaac Beeckman, Dutch philosopher and scientist (died 1637)
- Jean-Jacques Chifflet, French physician and antiquary (died 1660)
- Jan Janssonius, Dutch cartographer (died 1664)
- Cassiano dal Pozzo, Italian scholar and patron (died 1657)

== Deaths ==
- February 24 – Johann Weyer, Dutch physician and occultist (born 1515)
- March 1 – Jacques Daléchamps, French physician and botanist (born 1513)
- March 10 – Theodor Zwinger the elder, Swiss philosopher, physician and encyclopedist (born 1533)
- May 5 – Giorgio Biandrata, Italian court physician (born 1515)
- October 2– Bernardino Telesio, Italian philosopher and natural scientist (born 1509)
- Leonardo Fioravanti, Bolognese physician (born 1517)
- Jacques le Moyne, French scientific illustrator (born c. 1533)
