= 1519 in science =

List of years in science	(table)
- … 1509; 1510; 1511; 1512; 1513; 1514; 1515; 1516; 1517; 1518; 1519; 1520; 1521; 1522; 1523; 1524; 1525; 1526; 1527; 1528; 1529 …
- Art; Archaeology; Architecture; Literature; Music; Philosophy; Science; +...

The year 1519 in science and technology included many events, some of which are listed here.

== Exploration ==
- September 20 – Ferdinand Magellan's fleet sets sail from Sanlúcar de Barrameda to find a westabout route to Asia.
- "Miller Atlas" produced in Portugal.

== Medicine ==
- A pandemic spreads from the Greater Antilles into Central America, and perhaps as far as Peru, killing much of the indigenous populations in these areas.
- Publication in Paris of Thomas Linacre's translation into Latin of Galen's Methodus medendi.

== Births ==
- June 6 – Andrea Cesalpino, Italian philosopher, physician, and botanist (died 1603)

== Deaths ==
- May 2 – Leonardo da Vinci, Italian polymath (born 1452)
