= 1590 in science =

List of years in science	(table)
- … 1580; 1581; 1582; 1583; 1584; 1585; 1586; 1587; 1588; 1589; 1590; 1591; 1592; 1593; 1594; 1595; 1596; 1597; 1598; 1599; 1600 …
- Art; Archaeology; Architecture; Literature; Music; Philosophy; Science; +...

The year 1590 in science and technology involved some significant events.

== Botany ==
- Establishment of Hortus Botanicus Leiden. Its director was Carolus Clusius.

== Births ==
- Marie Fouquet, French medical writer (died 1681)
- approx. date – Giovanni Battista Zupi, Italian astronomer (died 1650)

== Deaths ==
- August 25 – Giulio Alessandrini, Italian physician, author, and poet (born 1506).
- December 20 – Ambroise Paré, French surgeon (born c. 1510).
