= 1589 in science =

List of years in science	(table)
- … 1579; 1580; 1581; 1582; 1583; 1584; 1585; 1586; 1587; 1588; 1589; 1590; 1591; 1592; 1593; 1594; 1595; 1596; 1597; 1598; 1599 …
- Art; Archaeology; Architecture; Literature; Music; Philosophy; Science; +...

The year 1589 in science and technology included a number of events, some of which are listed here.

== Astronomy ==
- Giovanni Antonio Magini's Novæ cœlestium orbium theoricæ congruentes cum observationibus N. Copernici is published in Venice, presenting a geocentric system of celestial spheres in opposition to the Copernican model.

== Botany ==
- Establishment of a botanical garden in Basel.

== Exploration ==
- Publication of Richard Hakluyt's The Principal Navigations, Voiages, Traffiques and Discoueries of the English Nation begins.

== Medicine ==
- Publication of Oswald Gabelchover's Artzneybuch in Tübingen. This medical textbook will go through at least eight editions.
- Baldo Angelo Abati : De admirabili viperae natura et de mirificis eiusdem facultatibus published at Urbino.

== Births ==
- July 3 : Johann Georg Wirsung, German anatomist (died 1643).

== Deaths ==
- January – Thomas Penny, English botanist and entomologist (born 1530)
- April 7 – Julius Caesar Aranzi, Italian anatomist (born 1530)
- Probable date – Bernard Palissy, French ceramicist and hydraulic engineer (born c. 1510)
