= 1506 in science =

List of years in science	(table)
- … 1496; 1497; 1498; 1499; 1500; 1501; 1502; 1503; 1504; 1505; 1506; 1507; 1508; 1509; 1510; 1511; 1512; 1513; 1514; 1515; 1516 …
- Art; Archaeology; Architecture; Literature; Music; Philosophy; Science; +...

The year 1506 in science and technology included many events, some of which are listed here.

== Astronomy ==
- Possible date – Nicolaus Copernicus begins to write De revolutionibus orbium coelestium ("On the Revolution of the Heavenly Spheres"). He sends an abstract, the Commentariolus, to other scientists interested in the matter before 1514 and is considered to have finished De revolutionibus in 1530, but hesitates to publish before 1543, the year of his death.

== Exploration ==
- Portuguese mariner Tristão da Cunha sights the islands of Tristan da Cunha.

== Deaths ==
- May 20 – Christopher Columbus, Italian explorer (born 1451).
