= 1501 in science =

List of years in science	(table)
- … 1491; 1492; 1493; 1494; 1495; 1496; 1497; 1498; 1499; 1500; 1501; 1502; 1503; 1504; 1505; 1506; 1507; 1508; 1509; 1510; 1511 …
- Art; Archaeology; Architecture; Literature; Music; Philosophy; Science; +...

The year 1501 in science and technology included many events, some of which are listed below.

== Astronomy ==
- Nilakantha Somayaji completes his astronomical treatise Tantrasamgraha.
- Amerigo Vespucci maps the two stars Alpha Centauri and Beta Centauri, as well as the stars of the constellation Crux, which are below the horizon in Europe.

== Exploration ==
- March 25 – Portuguese navigator João da Nova probably discovers Ascension Island.
- November 1 (All Saints) – Amerigo Vespucci discovers and names Baía de Todos os Santos in Brazil.
- Gaspar Corte-Real makes the first known landing in North America by a Western European explorer this millennium.
- Rodrigo de Bastidas becomes the first European to explore the Isthmus of Panama.

== Medicine ==
- Continuing until 1587, a pandemic outbreak of fever, headache, sweating and black tongue spreads through Europe. Initially called morbus Hungaricus (the Hungarian disease), it will later be regarded as an outbreak of typhus.

== Births ==
- January 17 – Leonhart Fuchs, German botanist (died 1566)
- March 23 – Pietro Andrea Mattioli, Italian physician and botanist (died 1577)
- September 24 – Gerolamo Cardano, Italian mathematician and physician (died 1576)
- approx. date – Garcia de Orta, Portuguese Sephardi Jewish physician (died 1568)

== Deaths ==
- presumed date – Gaspar Corte-Real, Portuguese explorer (born 1450)
