= 1502 in science =

List of years in science	(table)
- … 1492; 1493; 1494; 1495; 1496; 1497; 1498; 1499; 1500; 1501; 1502; 1503; 1504; 1505; 1506; 1507; 1508; 1509; 1510; 1511; 1512 …
- Art; Archaeology; Architecture; Literature; Music; Philosophy; Science; +...

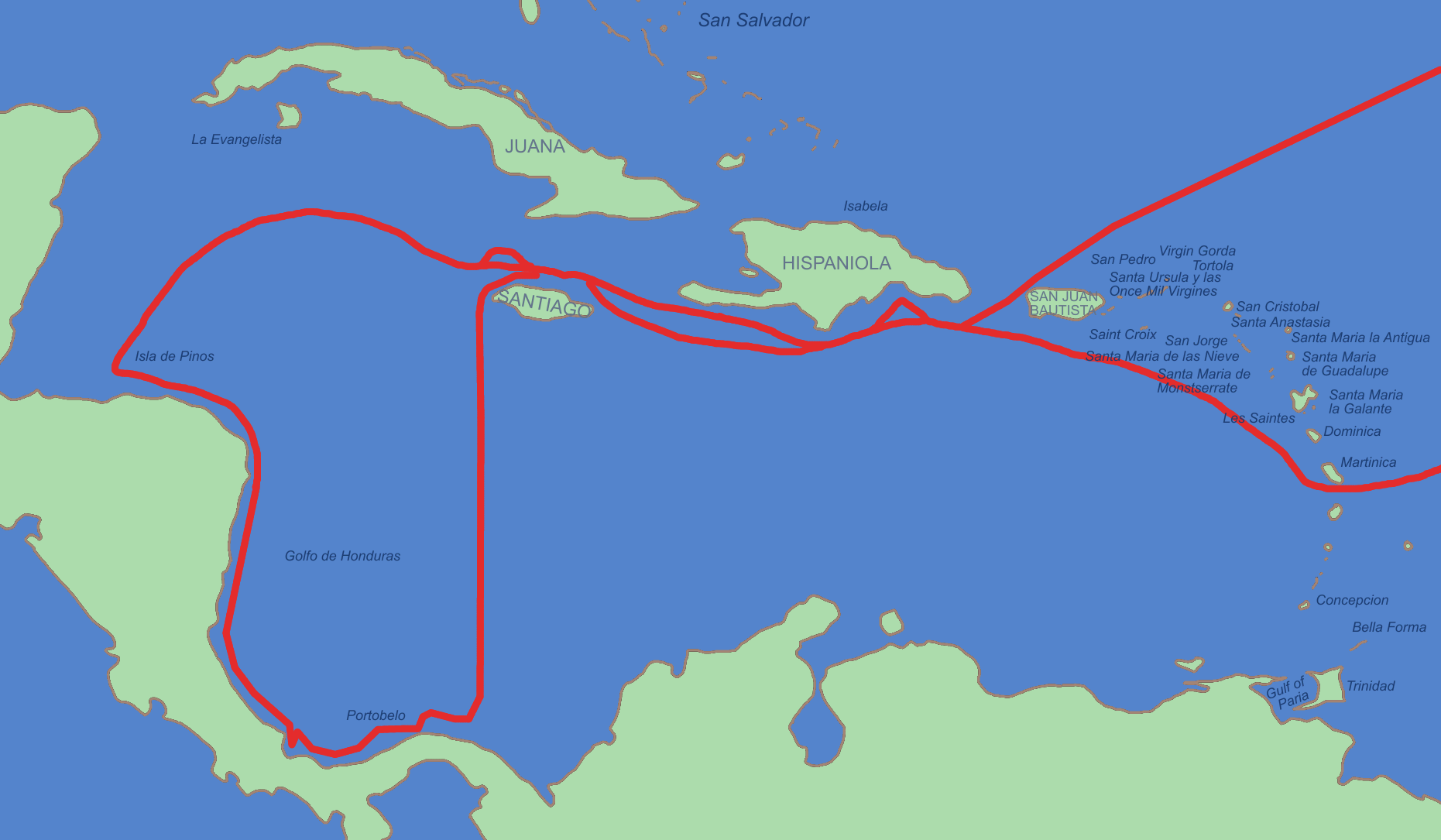
The fourth, and final, voyage taken by Christopher Columbus in 1502

The year 1502 in science and technology included many events, some of which are listed below.

== Exploration ==
- January 1 – Portuguese explorers, led by Pedro Álvares Cabral, sail into Guanabara Bay, Brazil, mistaking it for the mouth of a river, which they name Rio de Janeiro.
- May 11 – Christopher Columbus leaves Cadiz, Spain for his fourth and final voyage to the New World.
- May 21 – Portuguese navigator João da Nova discovers the uninhabited island of Saint Helena.
- August 14 – Columbus lands at Trujillo and names the country 'Honduras'.
- September 18 – Columbus lands in Costa Rica.
- Amerigo Vespucci, on his return to Lisbon from a voyage to the New World, writes a letter, Mundus Novus, to Lorenzo de' Medici indicating that South America must be an independent continent.
- The Cantino planisphere is the first known world map showing Portuguese discoveries.

== Technology ==
- In Germany, Peter Henlein of Nuremberg uses iron parts and coiled springs to build a portable timepiece, the first "Nuremberg Eg".

== Births ==
- Pedro Nunes, Portuguese mathematician (died 1578)
- approx. date – Jorge Reinel, Portuguese cartographer (d. after 1572)
