= 1503 in science =

List of years in science	(table)
- … 1493; 1494; 1495; 1496; 1497; 1498; 1499; 1500; 1501; 1502; 1503; 1504; 1505; 1506; 1507; 1508; 1509; 1510; 1511; 1512; 1513 …
- Art; Archaeology; Architecture; Literature; Music; Philosophy; Science; +...

The year 1503 in science and technology included many events, some of which are listed below.

== Astronomy ==
- July 23 – Unknown at this time, Pluto moves outside Neptune's orbit, remaining there for 233 years.

== Exploration ==
- May 10 – Christopher Columbus first sights the Cayman Islands, which he names Las Tortugas after the numerous sea turtles there.

== Technology ==
- April 21 – Battle of Cerignola: Spanish forces defeat the French, considered the first battle in history won by gunpowder small arms.
- Giuliano da Sangallo constructs the city waIls of Arezzo in Tuscany using the new technology of bastions.

== Births ==
- December 14 – Nostradamus, French physician and astrologer (died 1566)
