= Leonardo Fioravanti =

Leonardo Fioravanti may refer to:

- Leonardo Fioravanti (doctor) (1518–1588), Italian doctor
- Leonardo Fioravanti (engineer) (born 1938), Italian car designer and engineer
- Leonardo Fioravanti (surfer) (born 1997), Italian surfer
