= 1654 in science =

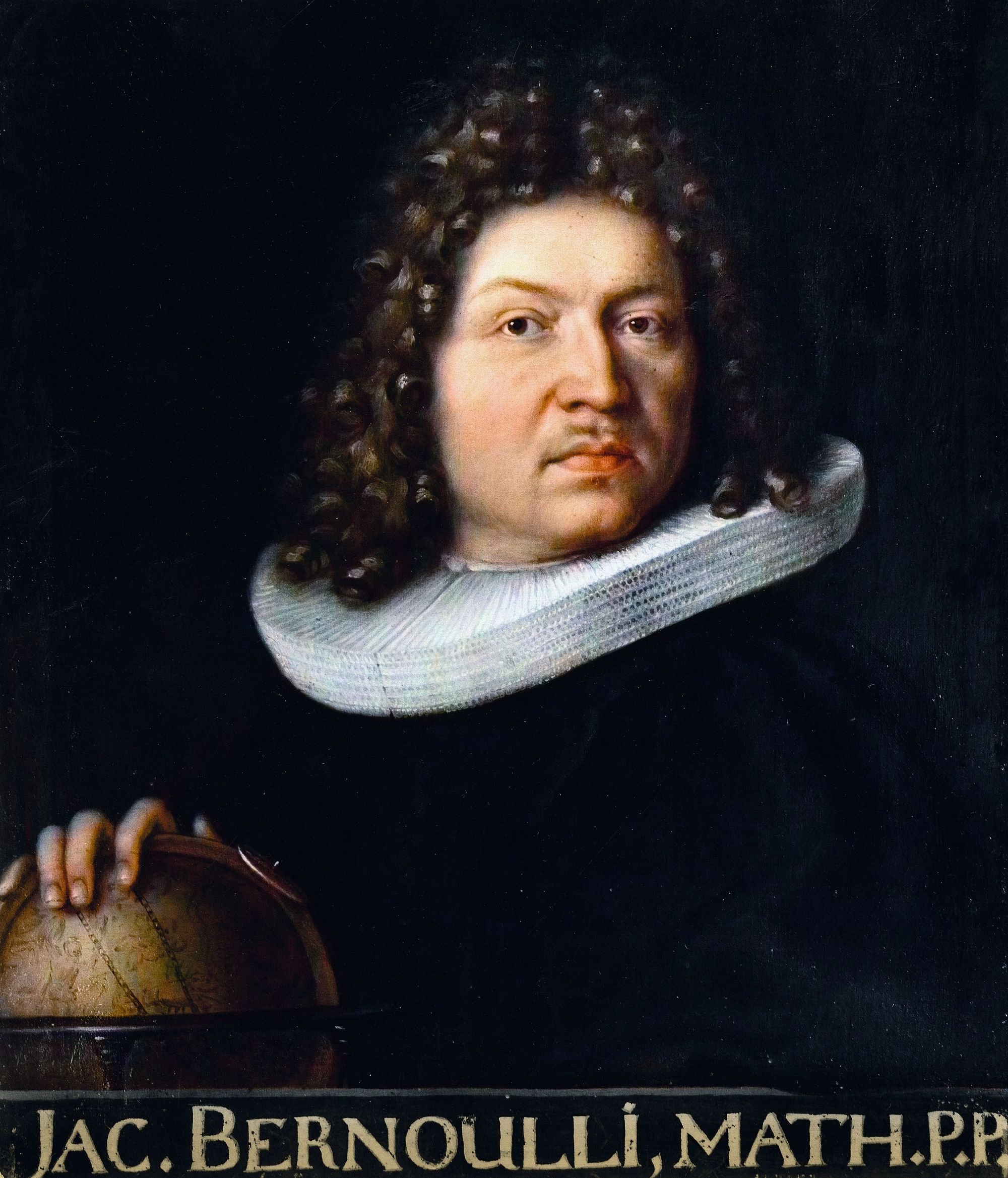
Mathematician Jakob Bernoulli was born in 1654.

The year 1654 in science and technology involved some significant events.

== Astronomy ==
- Sicilian astronomer Giovanni Battista Hodierna publishes De systemate orbis cometici, deque admirandis coeli characteribus including a catalog of comets and nebulae.

== Mathematics ==
- At the prompting of the Chevalier de Méré, Blaise Pascal corresponds with Pierre de Fermat on gambling problems, from which is born the theory of probability.

== Physics ==
- May 8 – Otto von Guericke demonstrates the effectiveness of his vacuum pump and the power of atmospheric pressure using the Magdeburg hemispheres before Ferdinand III, Holy Roman Emperor, in Regensburg.

== Births ==
- December 27 – Jakob Bernoulli, Swiss mathematician (died 1705).
- John Banister, English missionary and botanist (died 1692).
- prob. date – Eleanor Glanville, English entomologist (died 1709).

== Deaths ==
- August 31 – Ole Worm, Danish physician, natural historian and antiquary (born 1588)
- October 18 – Nicholas Culpeper, English herbalist (born 1616)
- Giovanni de Galliano Pieroni, Italian military engineer and astronomer (born 1586)
