= Parallel rulers =

Drafting instrument used to draw parallel lines

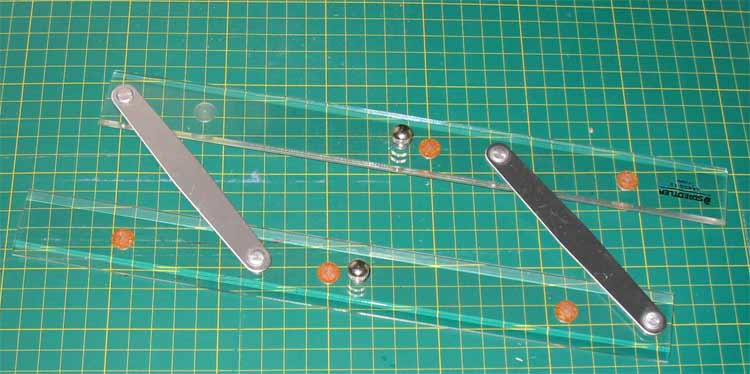
Parallel rule in plastic with aluminum arms lying on a cutting mat

Parallel rulers are a drafting instrument used by navigators to draw parallel lines on charts. The tool consists of two straightedges joined by two arms which allow them to move closer or further away while always remaining parallel to each other.

== History ==
The parallel ruler was invented at about 1584 by Fabrizio Mordente, as well as by Taqi al-Din who died in 1585. However it was not in common use (at least in Europe) until the 18th century.

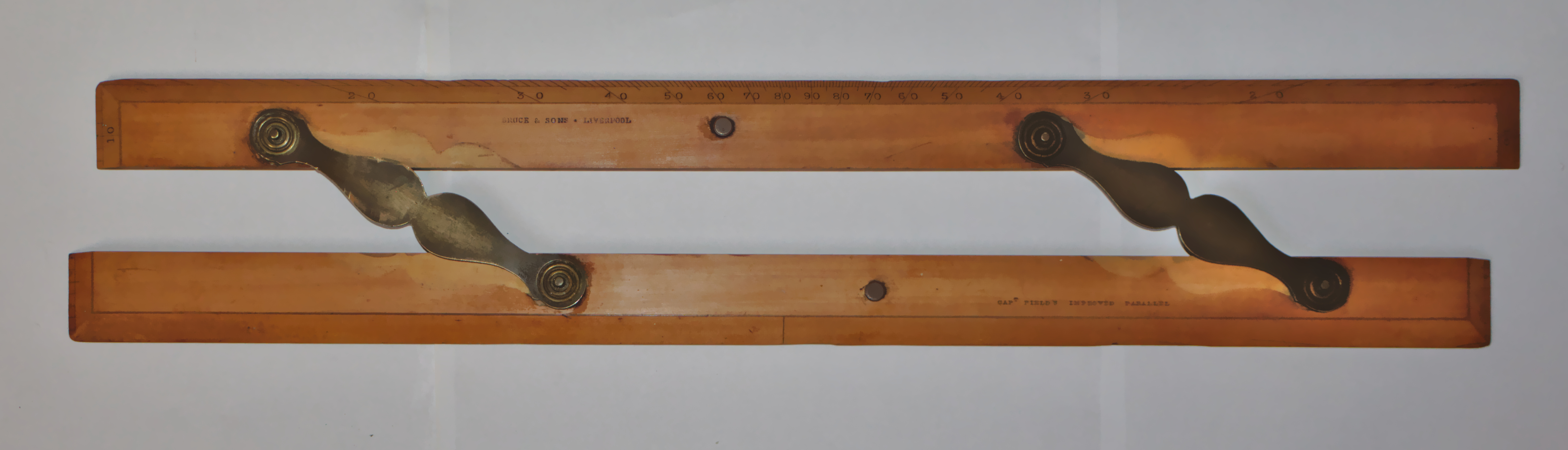
Captain Field's Improved Parallel Rule

In the 19th century a retired sea captain, Captain William Andrew Field (Note: Captain William Andrew Field (c. 1796–1871). In February 1833 he rescued 14 sailors from the Sicilian brig Felicita, which was wrecked on rocks at the entrance to Sandy Haven in Milford Haven for which he received the RNLI Silver Medal and a medal from the Royal Humane Society.) improved the design by adding a protractor-style scale to the upper edge of one rule, and compass points to the opposing edge, which made reading bearings easier. Examples exist of boxwood, ivory or ebony, usually with brass hinges. The instrument usually had two links, but longer models sometimes had three, and sometimes the links were scissored. Another variation is the "roller" model which included a cylindrical roller for ease of use.

== See also ==
- Cras protractor
- Technical drawing tools
