= 1657 in science =

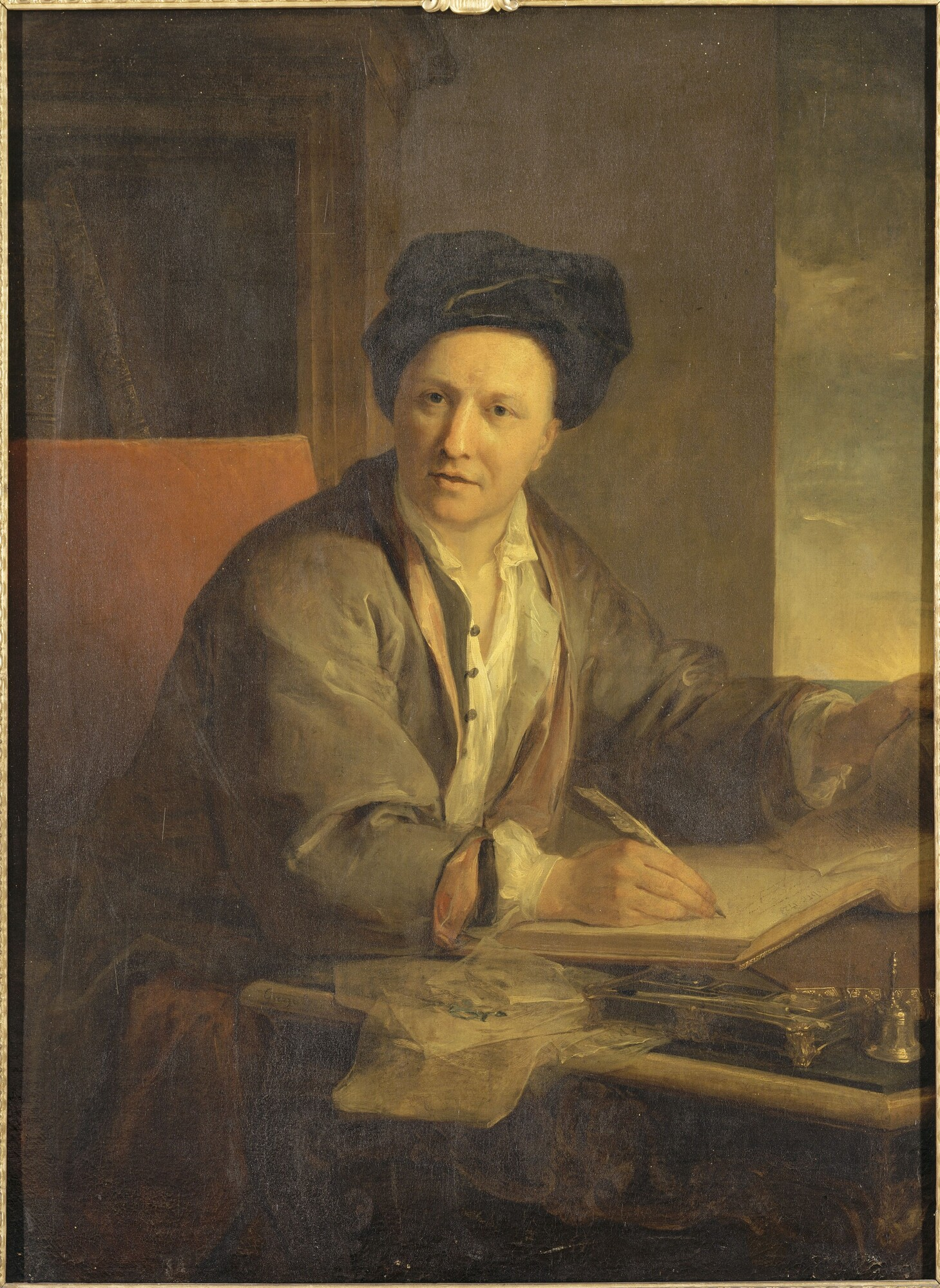
Portrait of Bernard le Bovier de Fontenelle, born 11 February 1657

The year 1657 in science and technology involved some significant events.

== Geography ==
- Peter Heylin publishes his Cosmographie, one of the earliest attempts to describe the entire world in English and the first known description of Australia.

== Mathematics ==
- Christiaan Huygens writes the first book to be published on probability theory, De ratiociniis in ludo aleae ("On Reasoning in Games of Chance").

== Medicine ==
- Walter Rumsey invents the provang, a baleen instrument which he describes in his Organon Salutis: an instrument to cleanse the stomach.

== Technology ==
- Christiaan Huygens patents his 1656 design for a pendulum clock and the first example is made for him by Salomon Coster at The Hague.
- approx. date – The anchor escapement for clocks is probably invented by Robert Hooke.

== Institutions ==
- Accademia del Cimento established in Florence.

== Births ==
- February 11 – Bernard le Bovier de Fontenelle, French scientific populariser (died 1757)
- approx. date – Pierre-Charles Le Sueur, French fur trader and explorer (died 1704)

== Deaths ==
- June 3 – William Harvey, English physician who discovered the circulation of blood (born 1578)
- June 16 – Fortunio Liceti, Italian Aristotelian scientific polymath (born 1577)
- September 23 – Joachim Jungius, German mathematician, logician and philosopher of science (born 1587)
- October 22 – Cassiano dal Pozzo, Italian scholar and patron (born 1588)
- November – John French, English physician and chemist (born c. 1616)
