= Gabriele Zerbi =

- Born: 1445; Verona
- Died: 1505 (aged 59–60); Dalmatia
- Occupations: Professor, Physician

Gabriele Zerbi (1445–1505) was a Veronese professor at the Universities of Bologna and Padua. He was also referred to as Zerbus, Zerbo, Zerbis, Gerbo, Gerbi, and Gerbus. He survived the devastating bubonic plague outbreak of 1477–79 in Northern Italy. He published the first printed treatise on geriatrics, "Gerontocomia: On the Care of the Aged," which took the form of a practical guide. His other works included: Questiones Metaphysicae; De Cautelis Medicorum; Liber anatomiae corporis humani et singulorum membrorum illius; De anatomia infantiis et porci ex traditione Cophonis, and Libellus de preservatione corporum a passione calculosa.

== Early life ==
Gabriele Zerbi was born in Verona to Francesco and Paola. Not much is known about his mother, Paola, but in various community documents that mention his father, Francesco, it appears that he was involved in various duties of civic responsibility, including the financial affairs of Verona. He had two brothers named Benedetto and Giovanni as well as two sisters named Taddea and Angela, the former also being the name given to Zerbi's daughter.

== Academic career ==
While it is unclear exactly where Zerbi obtained his university degree, he spent notable amount of his youth in Venice, leading to the belief that he studied at the University of Padua. It is also here that he began a four-year teaching post in philosophy starting in 1467 at the age of twenty-two. Zerbi also taught medicine and logic at the University of Bologna from 1475 to 1483. Between 1483 and 1494, Zerbi lived in Rome, but not much is known about his academic career during this time period. After living in Rome, he returned to the University of Padua to be a lecturer "de sero" between 1494 and 1505. In the summer of 1499 Zerbi went to Venice and practiced as a physician; he avoided paying taxes other physicians had to pay by only practicing there during the school break. In May 1503 Lorenzino de Medici became ill and sent for a physician from Florence to come and treat him; Zerbi was chosen over Hieronimo da Verona and given leave of absence from his teaching position.

== Death ==
Zerbi's death came about after treating his last patient. He was summoned by Skander, chief minister of the sultan of the Ottoman Turks. Zerbi had fled from the wrath of Pope Sixtus, and Skander was ill with a severe case of dysentery. The doctor brought along his young son on his visit to the Turks. After curing the prince, Zerbi received a large sum of gold, jewels, and other valuable items as payment. On his way home, however, the prince fell ill again and died due to not following Zerbi's instructions. His sons, thinking Zerbi had poisoned their father, pursued and captured Zerbi to punish him. They sawed Zerbi's son in half before him, then immediately sawed Zerbi in half as well. According to his will last dated on October 13, 1504, his wife Helena de' Metaselimi of Bologna and the godfather of his children Pietro of Mantua were the executors of his estate. After her, his estate would go to his four sons: Paolo, Hieronymo or Girolamo, Marco, and Giovanni Aloisio. In addition, he gave money to his daughters, Taddea and Hermodoria, his sisters, Clara and Angela, his brothers, Giovanni and Benedetto, and to his nephew, Francesco.

== Works ==
| Title | English title | Publishing information | Description |
|---|---|---|---|
| Questiones Metaphysicae | Metaphysical Questions | Impressum Bononiae per Johan de Nordlingen en Henric. De Harlem socios, anno salutis 1482, Kalen Decembr., sedente Sixto IV, Pont. Max. 'anno elus duodecimo'. Quarto piccolo (small) | A commentary on Aristotle's own Metaphysics that quoted individuals such as Hippocrates, Plato, Hermes, and many other ancient, medieval, and Renaissance scholars. |
| Gerentocomia, opus quod de senectute agit | On The Effects of Old Age | Gabrielis Zerbi Veronesis as Innocentium VIII. Pont. Max. feliciter incipit. Impressum Romae per Eucharium Silber alias Frank, anno domini 1489 di vero Veneris 27, nonis novembris. Small Quarto, 2 columns, gothic types, folios 128 (unnumbered) with register. 57 chapters in total. | Considered the first complete medical treatise on geriatrics. It consists of the causes & signs of old age and the duties of caretakers. |
| De Cautelis Medicorum | On Rules of Caution for Physicians | Opus pertutile editum a clarissimo philosopho ac Medico Magistro Gabriele Zerbo Veronese Theroricae Medicinae ordinarium Studii Patavini publice legente anno Domini 1495. Padua, Dominicus Berthonus, 1495, 1503, Pavia 1508, 1517 (M. Jacob. De Burgophranco), Lyon 1525, 1582, Pavia 1528, 1598, Christophorus de Pensis, Venice post 1495 | De Cautelis Medicorum is a set of medical ethics and rules, most of which are derived from the ancient medical authorities, that embody the canones of practical as well as theoretical medicine. These rules are aimed at protecting the integrity of physicians and the medical profession. |
| Liber anatomiae corporis humani et singulorum membrorum illius | The Book of Anatomy of the Human Body and Each of its Members | Editum per Excellentiss. Philosophum ac Medicum Dom. Gabriele De Zerbis Veronensem Venetis per Presbyterum Bonatum locatellum Bergomensem expensis heredum Nobilis Viri Domino Octaviani Scoti Civis modoetiensis anno domini 1502, 9. kal Januarias. Folios 219 + 1/2. | This book is a comprehensive book on human anatomy that consists of descriptions and diagrams. |
| Opus praeclarum anathomiae totius corporis humani et singulorum membrorum illius editum ab excel (Second Edition) | The Work of the Whole of the Anatomy of the Human Body and its Individual Members | Impress. Venet. Apud Octavianum Scotum anno Domini 1533, VII. Kal. Octobris. 234 folios in total. Small gothic print | This work is an in depth study of the anatomy of the human body. |
| De anatomia infantiis et porci ex traditione Cophonis | On the Anatomy of Infants and Pigs from the Tradition of Cophonis | Marburg, Eucharius Cervicornus 1537 with Johannes Dryander. Printed in Marburg in 1537 and in Venice, 1592 | A study of the anatomy of the human body in the first part of development such as embryos in utero. |
| Libellulus de Preservatione Corporum a Passione Calculosa | The Book of Preserving Bodies from Suffering Stones | Manuscript Biblioteca Civica Verona No. 775, Cl, Medic. 91, 1, Busta A. 130 folios (A translation by Touwaide and De Santo, in preparation) | A treatise on the causes and of kidney and bladder stones. |

His first work, Questiones Metaphysicae, was a commentary on Aristotle's own Metaphysics.

Gerontocomia discussed the coping and treating of elderly. It discussed topics such as diet, optimal living situations, beneficial medicines, and how to ensure the physical well-being of the elderly. De Cautelis Medicorum was a text discussing the medical ethics that a practicing physician should follow. The text included what a physician's appearance should resemble, hygienic habits, and preferred spiritual beliefs. Liber Anathomie Corporis Humani De Generatione Embrionis was Zerbi's last published essay; it covered most of Zerbi's work on pregnant animals.

Zerbi was a strong advocate for the code of physicians. This code includes six categories of rules all physicians should abide by.

1. Rules for the course of studies and the perfection of the physician, according to the congenital dispositions of the soul and body.
2. The obligations of the physician toward God.
3. Recommendations for acquired dispositions and general conduct.
4. The proper attitude toward the patient.
5. Rules for the attitude toward the patient's family and other people involved with the cure.
6. Regulation of the physician's relationship with the general public.

Zerbi gained much of his knowledge of human anatomy by dissecting various animals since human cadavers were scarce. By doing this, he opened up the first discipline of comparative anatomy.

He also was one of the first physicians to separate the organs into systems and focused his attention on the kidneys. He discovered veins do not enter inside the kidneys, but only reach their periphery. Zerbi hypothesized the kidneys act as a filter to filter liquid before it enters the bladder but other physicians doubted this.
