= 8th century in science =

This is a summary of the 8th century in science and technology.

== Astronomy ==
- Mashallah ibn Athari participated in the founding of Baghdad for Caliph Al-Mansur by working with a group of astrologers led by Naubakht the Persian to pick an electional horoscope for the founding of the city.
- Mashallah ibn Athari wrote over twenty works on predominantly astrology, which became authoritative in later centuries at first in the Middle East, and then in the West when horoscopic astrology was transmitted back to Europe beginning in the 12th century.

== Mathematics ==
- The use of zero, essential in practical mathematics, is now known in Baghdad and is adopted by others.

== Predicted and scheduled events ==
- List of 8th-century lunar eclipses
- List of solar eclipses in the 8th century

== See also ==
- Science in the medieval Islamic world
