= Astrological allegory =

An astrological allegory is an allegory (a story conveying a symbolic meaning instead of a literal one) based on astrology, that is, the movement of stars and planets as seen from the Earth. The most common symbols are the movements of the Sun and the Moon.

Many ancient religions are based on astrological allegories, that is, allegories of the movement of the Sun and the Moon as seen from the Earth. Examples include the cult of Horus/Isis.

Some of Giordano Bruno's most important works are astrological allegories or cosmological tracts. One of these, Lo Spaccio de la Bestia Trionfante (The Expulsion of the Triumphant Beast, 1584), was famously reprised by James Joyce.

== See also ==
- Astrotheology
- Allegorical interpretations of Genesis
- Religious cosmology
- Esoteric cosmology
- Biblical cosmology
- René Guénon
