= Simon Baskerville =

English physician

Sir Simon Baskerville, M.D. (1574–1641) was an English physician.

== Life ==
Baskerville, son of Thomas Baskerville, (apothecary and sometimes one of the stewards of Exeter, who was descended from the ancient family of the Baskervilles in Herefordshire), was baptised at the church of St. Mary Major, Exeter, on 27 October 1574. After receiving a suitable preliminary education, he was sent to Oxford, was taught under Dr Thomas Holland, and matriculated on 10 March 1591 as a member of Exeter College, where he was placed under the care of William Helm, a man famous for his piety and learning. On the first vacancy, he was elected a fellow of the college before he had graduated B.A., and he did not take that degree until 8 July 1596.

Subsequently, he proceeded M.A. On the occasion of King James I's visit to the university, Baskerville was "chosen as a prime person to dispute before him in the philosophic art, which he performed with great applause of his majesty, who was not only there as a hearer, but as an accurate judge". Turning his attention to the study of physic, he graduated M.B. on 20 June 1611 and was afterward created doctor in that faculty. He seems to have practiced at Oxford for some years with considerable success. Then he removed to London, where he was admitted a candidate in the College of Physicians on 18 April 1614 and a fellow on 20 March 1614–15. He was censor of the college in 1615 and several subsequent years, anatomy reader in 1626, and consiliarius in 1640.

He attained to great eminence in his profession and was appointed physician to James I and afterwards to Charles I, who conferred on him the honour of knighthood 30 August 1636. It is related that he had no fewer than a hundred patients a week, and that he amassed so much wealth as to acquire the title of "Sir Simon Baskerville the rich". Further it is recorded of him "that he was a great friend to the clergy and the inferior loyal gentry", insomuch that "he never took a fee of an orthodox minister under a dean, nor of any suffering cavalier in the cause of Charles I under a gentleman of an hundred a year, but with physick to their bodies generally gave relief to their necessities".

He died on 5 July 1641 and was buried in St. Paul's Cathedral, where a mural monument, with a Latin epitaph, was erected to his memory.
