= 1652 in science =

The year 1652 in science and technology involved some significant events.

== Publications ==
- Elias Ashmole publishes his anthology of English alchemical literature, Theatrum Chemicum Britannicum.
- Gerard Boate's Natural History of Ireland is published posthumously.
- Nicholas Culpeper publishes his herbal, The English Physitian, or, An astrologo-physical discourse on the vulgar herbs of this nation, being a compleat method of physick, whereby a man may preserve his body in health, or cure himself, being sick.
- Priest, statesman, economist and poet Robert Arnauld d'Andilly publishes La manière de cultiver les arbres fruitiers. Par le Sieur Le Gendre, curé d'Hénonville. Où il est traité des pepinieres, des espaliers, des contr'espaliers, des arbres en buisson, & à haute tige in Paris, advocating the training of fruit trees on espaliers.

== Births ==
- April 21 – Michel Rolle, French mathematician, known for Rolle's theorem (died 1719)

== Deaths ==
- October 8 – John Greaves, English astronomer (born 1602)
- November 4 – Jean-Charles de la Faille, Flemish mathematician (born 1597)
- November 21 – Jan Brożek, Polish mathematician, physician and astronomer (born 1585)
