= 1533 in science =

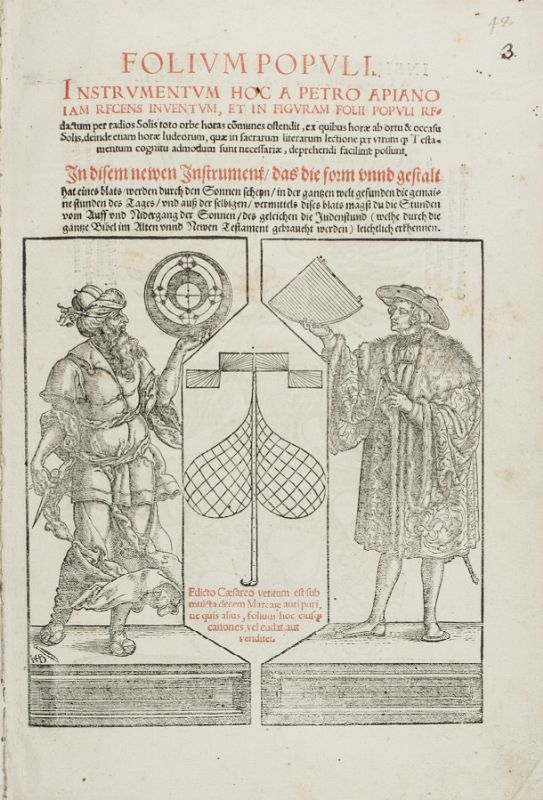
Poplar leaf. This instrument, recently invented by Peter Apian and fashioned into the shape of a poplar leaf, shows the common hours throughout the world by the sun's rays (Printed in Ingolstadt, October 22, 1533)

The year 1533 in science and technology included a number of events, some of which are listed here.

== Astronomy ==
- Petrus Apianus publishes at Ingolstadt Apiani horoscopion (On the Solar Quadrant), Buch Instrument (On Astronomical Instruments) and Folium populi (On the Portable Sundial).

== Botany ==
- Rembert Dodoens publishes his Herbarium.

== Exploration ==
- October 30 – The Concepción and San Lázaro, on the instruction of Hernán Cortés, leave Manzanillo to explore the Pacific Ocean.
- Fortún Ximénez is the first European known to land in Baja California (where he is killed by natives).

== History of science ==
- Georgius Agricola publishes De Mensuis et Ponderibus on the weights and measures of Classical antiquity.

== Mathematics ==
- First printed edition of Euclid's Elements in the original Greek published in Basel, edited by Simon Grynaeus including integral diagrams and the first printing of Proclus' commentary on the first book.
- Gemma Frisius publishes De Locorum describendorum ratione in Antwerp, containing the first known statement of the principles of triangulation and a means for determining longitude.

== Technology ==
- Antonio da Sangallo the Younger constructs the Fortezza da Basso in Florence, considered as a model in bastion fortress design.

== Births ==
- May 20 – Hieronymus Fabricius, Italian anatomist (died 1619)
- August 2 – Theodor Zwinger the elder, Swiss philosopher, physician and encyclopedist (died 1588)
- November 23 – Prospero Alpini, Venetian-born physician and botanist (died 1617)
- Approx. date
  - Jacques Le Moyne de Morgues, French scientific illustrator (died 1588)
  - Friedrich Risner, German mathematician (died 1580)
  - Lucas Janszoon Waghenaer, Dutch nautical chartmaker (died 1606)

== Deaths ==
- May 31 – Ambrosius Ehinger, Bavarian explorer of South America (born c. 1500)
- August 16 – Diogo Ribeiro, Portuguese-Spanish cartographer and explorer (b. unknown)
- Johannes Ruysch, cartographer (born c. 1460?)
