= Baldo Angelo Abati =

Italian physician and naturalist

- Born: Gubbio, Italy
- Known for: De natura et de Vipera admirabili mirificis facultatibus eiusdem liber
- Scientific career
- Fields: Medicine, natural history

Baldo Angelo Abati (in Latin Baldus Angelus Abatius; born in Gubbio) was an Italian physician and naturalist. He lived in the second half of the sixteenth century.

Baldo Angelo Abati’s De natura et de Vipera admirabili mirificis facultatibus eiusdem liber (published in 1589 in Urbino), was one of the first books about snakes. It was dedicated to Francesco Maria II della Rovere, the sixth duke of Urbino. A second edition appeared in 1591 in Urbino and a third in Nuremberg in 1603. The latter edition was reprinted twice prior to 1660. Five of the 32 book chapters deal with the effects and medical uses of venom. In Chapter 14 Abati, who had dissected a rattlesnake, enumerated the edible parts of the snake and provided information about various methods for preparing of snake meat.

== Works ==
- De admirabili viperae natura, et de mirificis eiusdem facultatibus liber. Urbino, 1589
- De Admirabili Viperae natura, & de mirificis eiusdem facultatibus Liber. Nuremberg, 1603. Online-edition der Sächsischen Landesbibliothek - Staats- und Universitätsbibliothek Dresden. (Digital edition from 1660 by the University and State Library Düsseldorf)
- Opus discussarum concertationum praeclarum, de rebus, verbis, et sententiis controversis, ex omnibus fere scriptoribus, libri XV. Pesaro, 1594.
