= Denis Zachaire =

Denis Zachaire (1510–1556) is the pseudonym of a 16th-century alchemist who spent his life and family fortune in a futile search for the Philosopher's Stone and the Elixir of Life.

== Pursuit of alchemy ==
Born in 1510 to a noble and ancient family of Guienne, Zachaire was sent to school at a young age in Bordeaux under the care of a tutor hired by the family. The tutor was obsessed with alchemy and the Magnum Opus, and Zachaire quickly found himself caught up in the hysteria, pouring vast amounts of his parents' money into the mystic crucible.

Laboring tirelessly in smoke-filled chambers, Zachaire and his tutor spent over 200 crowns and his parents reduced his allowance. After returning home to mortgage his inheritance, Zachaire took up with a "Philosopher" and later with a monk, both of whom helped him spend whatever gold he had left.

In 1550, Zachaire claimed to transmute base metal into gold.
