= Jacques Daléchamps =

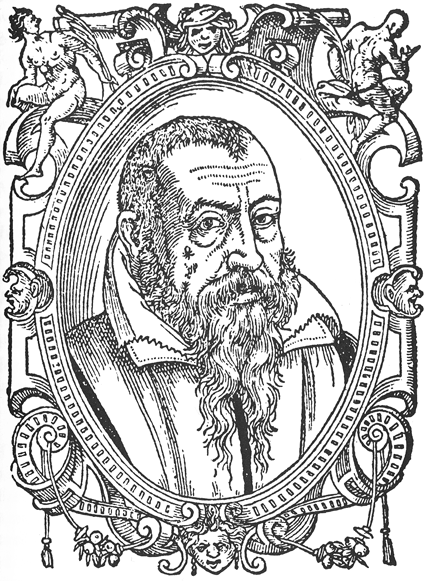
Jacques Daléchamps

Jacques Daléchamps (1513 in Caen – 1588) was a French botanist and physician.

He was the pupil of Guillaume Rondelet and became physician of the Hôtel-Dieu de Lyon.

In 1552, he published Raymond Chalin de Vinario's “treatise on the plague”.

== Works ==
- Histoire generale des plantes Bd.1-2 . Lyon 1615 Digital edition by the University and State Library Düsseldorf
