= Martin Helwig =

German cartographer

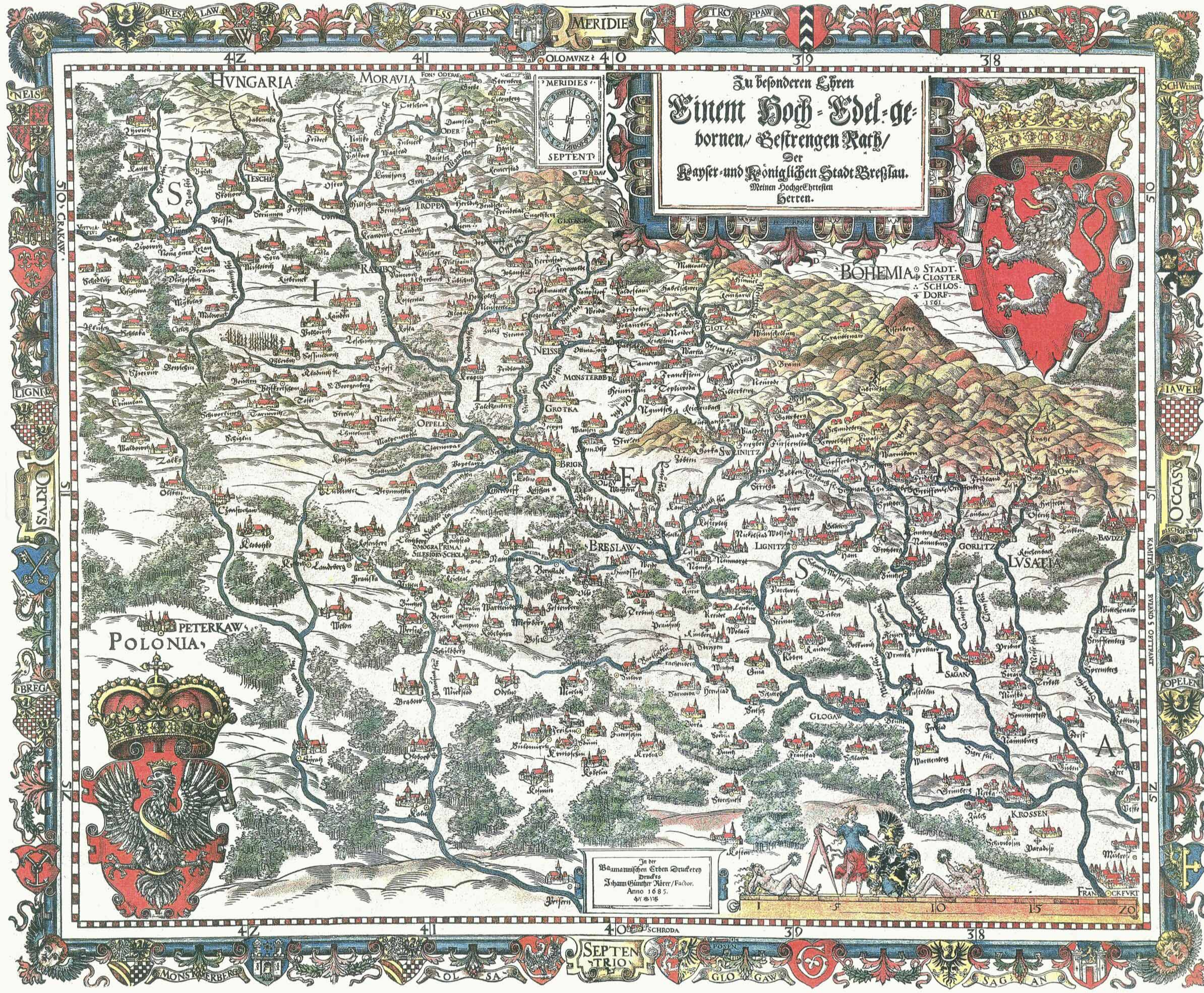
Martin Helwig's map of Silesia (south direction on top edge), 1685 reprint

Martin Helwig (Latin: Martino Heilwig) (5 November 1516 – 26 January 1574) was a German cartographer of Silesia and pedagogue. He was born in Neisse and died in Breslau, Holy Roman Empire.

== Life ==
A former pupil of an eminent German scholar and educationist Valentin Friedland, Helwig went on to study at the University of Wittenberg, where as a student of Martin Luther and Philip Melanchthon he earned the academic degree of Magister. In 1552, he became Rector of St. Maria Magdalena School in Breslau (now Wrocław, in Poland). Equally proficient in mathematics and geography as well as classical languages, he produced the first woodcut map of Silesia made on the basis of surveys and data collected from local inhabitants, which he published in 1561 under the title "Silesiae Typus", and dedicated to Nicolaus II. Rehdiger, a wealthy Silesian merchant, banker, philanthropist, governor and patron of the principality of Breslau sponsored the map. Martin Helwig's map went on to receive acclaim in a public writing by Caspar Peucer, an eminent German scholar at the University of Wittenberg, and was later republished in several versions of Abraham Ortelius's pioneering world atlas, "Theatrum Orbis Terrarum".

The first map of Silesia by Martin Helwig constituted until the middle of the 18th century the main model and source of information for the cartographical presentation of this region of Europe on the maps of the most famous cartographers and publishers of those times.
