= Joachim Jungius =

German mathematician, logician and science philosopher (1587-1657)

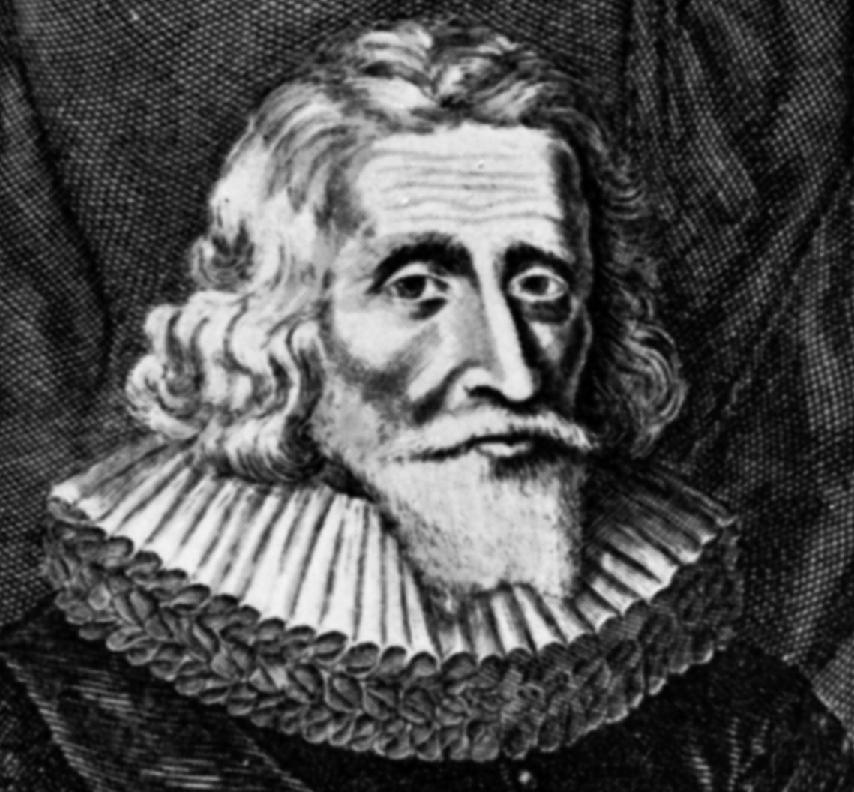
Joachim Jungius (1587–1657)

Joachim Jungius (born Joachim Junge; 22 October 1587 – 23 September 1657) was a German mathematician, logician and philosopher of science.

== Life ==
Jungius was a native of Lübeck. He studied metaphysics at the Universities of Rostock and Giessen, where in 1608 he earned his degree.

Beginning in 1609, he was a professor of mathematics at the University of Giessen, and in 1614–15, with Wolfgang Ratke (1571–1635) and Christoph Helvig (1581–1617), he took part in studies of educational reform. In 1616, he returned to Rostock in order to study medicine, later obtaining his medical doctorate from the University of Padua with Santorio Santorio in 1619. From 1619 to 1623, he practiced medicine in Lübeck. In 1622 at Rostock, he founded an early scientific society known as Societas Ereunetica sive Zetetica.

From 1624 to 1628, Jungius worked as a professor of mathematics at Rostock, his service here being briefly interrupted in 1625, when he spent time as professor of medicine at the University of Helmstedt. From 1629 until 1657, he was professor of natural sciences at the Akademisches Gymnasium, a secondary school in Hamburg. Jungius believed that science was based on mathematics, and in Hamburg stressed the importance of critical thinking to his students. He also felt that mathematics and logic served as a remedy to metaphysical and mystical speculation.

He died in Hamburg.

== Works ==
Jungius was an important figure of 17th century atomism, and was an advocate of a "corpuscular chemistry" that assumed the conservation of mass. He also demonstrated that a catenary was not a parabola.

In 1638 he published the textbook Logica Hamburgensis, which presented late medieval theories and techniques of logic. Here he demonstrated oblique cases of arguments that did not adhere to simpler forms of inference; An example being: "The square of an even number is even; 6 is even; therefore, the square of 6 is even". His double position as connected to scholastic logic, but also to innovations, earns him the classification semi-Ramist.

Gottfried Wilhelm Leibniz wrote,

"While Jungius of Lübeck is a man little known even in Germany itself, he was clearly of such judiciousness and such capacity of mind that I know of no other mortal, including even Descartes himself, from whom we could better have expected a great restoration of the sciences, had Jungius been either known or assisted."

Jung was a man of great intellect, he defined a plant as: "A plant is a living non-sentient body, attached to a particular place or habitat, where it is able to feed, to grow in size, and finally to propagate itself."

== Bibliography ==
- Joachim Jungius, Phoronomica sive doctrine de motu locali, 1689.
- Joachim Jungius, 1957. Logica Hamburgensis, facsimile reproduction of the original edition (Hamburg, 1638) edited by Rudolf W. Meyer, Hamburg: J.J. Augustin.
- Joachim Jungius, 1977. Logica Hamburgensis additamenta, edited by Wilhelm Risse, Göttingen: Vandenhoeck & Ruprecht.
- Joachim Jungius, 1988. Disputationes Hamburgenses, critical edition by Clemens Müller-Glauser, Göttingen: Vandenhoeck & Ruprecht.
