= Leonardo Fioravanti (doctor) =

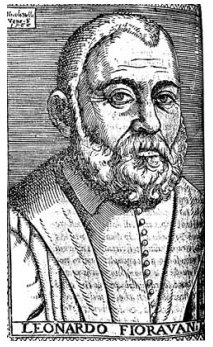
Leonardo Fioravanti (doctor)

Leonardo Fioravanti (1517–1588) was a noted doctor, surgeon and alchemist active in Italy in the 16th century.

== Biography ==
Born in Bologna on October 5, 1517, to Gabriele and Margarite Fioravanti, Leonardo was baptised at the Metropolitan Cathedral of Saint Peter. His family had ties to the celebrated architects Aristotele Fioravanti, Bartolomeo et Aristote. He received his first degree in medicine at Naples, and his second on March 27, 1568, at Bologna. He was elevated into the nobility by the king of Spain.

He lived for a time in Rome and in Venice, and also in other important Italian cities. In Palermo, he performed the first recorded splenectomy on Italian soil.

Historians "have long portrayed Leonardo Fioravanti as the epitome of the cunning and dishonest charlatan." Although "he was by no means the first or the only one to take to the road."

Fioravanti died in Bologna in 1588.

== Works ==
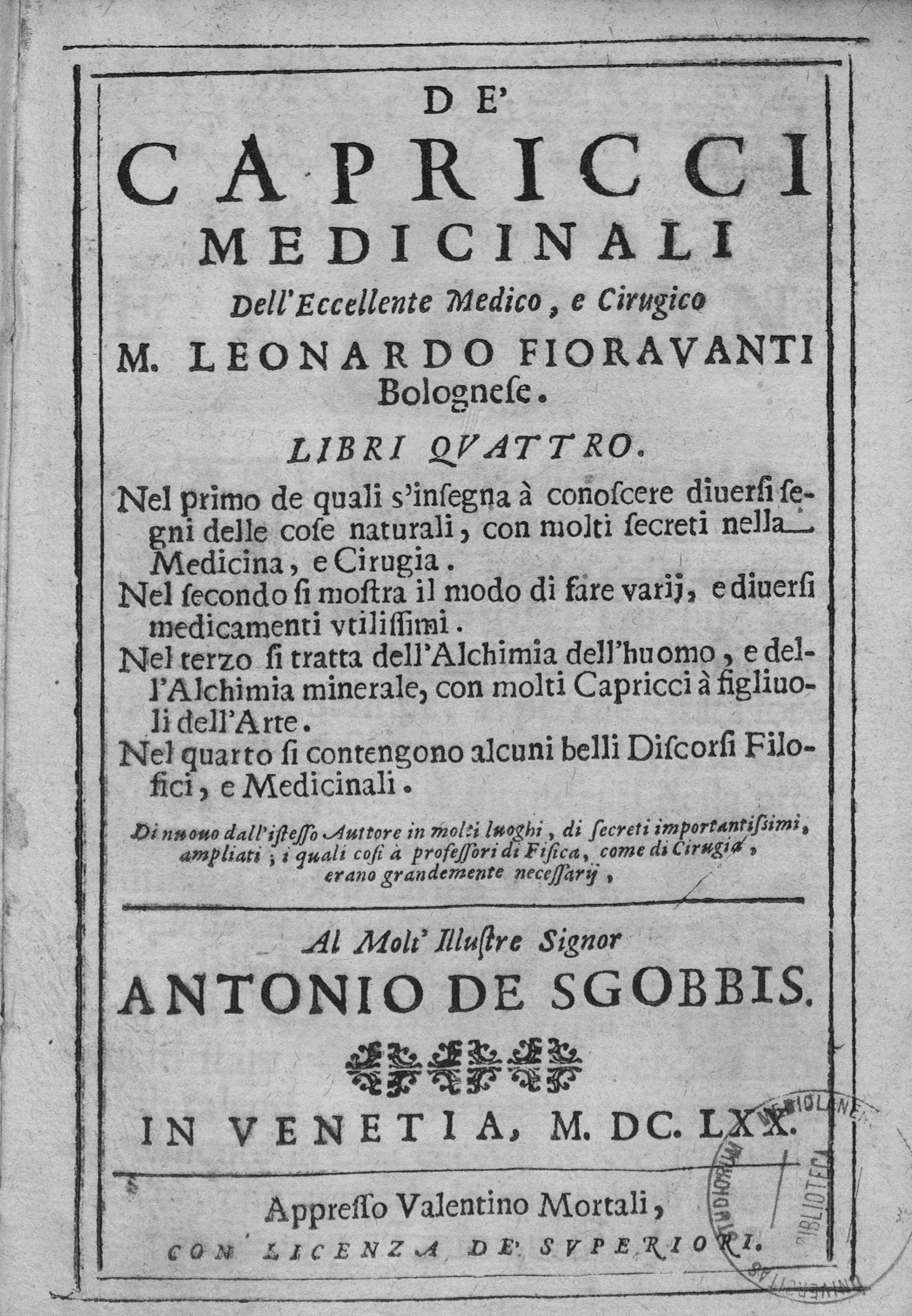
De' capricci medicinali, 1670

- Capricci medicinali (Venice, 1561)
- Secreti medicinali (Venice, 1561)
- Dello specchio di scientia universale (Venice, 1564)
- Del regimento della peste (Venice, 1565)
- Del compendio de i secreti rationali (Venice, 1566)
- La cirurgia (Venice, 1570). Translated into English in 1580 by John Hester as A Short Discours upon Chirurgerie
- Della fisica (Venice, 1582)
- Il tesoro della vita humana (Venice, 1582)
