= 1525 in science =

The year 1525 in science and technology included many events, some of which are listed here.

== Events ==
- Albrecht Dürer's book on geometry and perspective, The Painter's Manual (more literally, the Instructions on Measurement) is published at Nuremberg. It is the first book for adults to be published on mathematics in German.
- First publication of Galen's Of the method of curing diseases in the original Greek, by the Aldine Press in Venice.
- First publication of the complete collected Hippocratic Corpus, translated into Latin, in Rome.
- Christoff Rudolff's Behend und hübsch Rechnung durch die kunstreichen regeln Algebre so gemeincklich die Coss genent werden introduces the modern radical symbol (for square root), √ (without the vinculum above the radicand).
- Publication of Richard Banckes' Herball, the first true herbal printed in Britain.
- First woodcut map of France, produced by Oronce Finé.
- approx. date – Paracelsus discovers the analgesic properties of diethyl ether.

== Births ==
- September 25 – Steven Borough, English explorer (died 1584)
- December 1 – Tadeáš Hájek, Czech medical doctor and astronomer (died 1600)
- approx. date – Hans Staden, German adventurer (d. c.1579)
- Tomás de Mercado, Spanish economist and theologian (died 1575)

== Deaths ==
- approx. date – Henricus Grammateus, Swiss mathematician (born c. 1492)
