= Fabrizio Mordente =

Italian mathematician and inventor (1532–1608)

Fabrizio Mordente (Salerno, 1532 – ca 1608) was an Italian mathematician. He is best known for his invention of the "proportional eight-pointed compass" which has two arms with cursors that allow the solution of problems in measuring the circumference, area and angles of a circle. In 1567 he published a single sheet treatise in Venice showing illustrations of his device.

== Life and career ==
Fabrizio Mordente was born in Salerno, Italy, and studied at the Università di Napoli. After completing his studies at the age of 20, he set out to see the world. He left Naples in 1552 and visited Crete, Cyprus, Egypt, Palestine and Mesopotamia. After reaching the Persian Gulf, he took a Portuguese ship to India. He stayed in Goa for three years and then continued his voyage around the Cape of Good Hope, eventually arriving in Lisbon. He went from there to Paris and visited other European cities before returning to Italy and visiting Venice, Florence and Rome. During this trip he drafted the initial design for his compass.

Based on the success of his design, Mordente took service in 1571 at the court of Emperor Maximilian II in Vienna. From 1578 he served in Prague at the court of Rudolph II, to whom he dedicated an edition of Anversa in 1584. In Prague, he also met Michiel Coignet and Giordano Bruno, who used the compass to refute Aristotle's hypothesis on the incommensurability of infinitesimals, thus confirming the existence of the "minimum" which was the basis of his atomic theory. Bruno published the dialogues Mordentius and De Mordentii circino which praised Mordente, but also presented criticisms that raised protests from the mathematician. Mordente replied in 1586 and Bruno responded with the satires Idiota triumphans and De somnii interpretatione. After Mordente gained support in the dispute from the French Charles, Duke of Guise, Bruno was forced to flee Paris.

After this controversy, Mordente took service with the Duke of Guise until his death. In 1591 Mordente returned to Italy and entered the service of Alexander Farnese, Duke of Parma, where he published his last mathematical treatise.

== Publication ==
Mordente published a number of treatises on mathematics and the use of his compass. These include:

- Modo di trovare con l’astrolabio, o quadrante, o altro instromento, oltre gradi, intieri, i minuti, et secondi, et ognaltra particella, Venezia 1567
- Il compasso del s. Fabritio Mordente con altri istromenti mathematici ritrovati da Gasparo suo fratello, Anversa, Ch. Plantino, 1584
- Il compasso e figura di Fabritio Mordente..., Parigi, J. Le Clerc, 1585 Milano, Biblioteca Ambrosiana, D 235 inf., Problema mirabile di Fabritio Mordente (1586 circa), ms., cc. 107, 239; Q. 122. sup., c. 106r
- La quadratura del cerchio, la scienza de’ residui, il compasso et riga di Fabritio, et di Gasparo Mordente fratelli salernitani, Anversa, Ph. Galle, 1591 (Roma, Biblioteca nazionale, copia manoscritta, Gesuitico, 615)
- Le propositioni di Fabritio Mordente salernitano…, Roma, A. Giamin, 1598
