= 1571 in science =

The year 1571 in science and technology included a number of events, some of which are listed here.

== Mathematics ==
- François Viète begins publication of Francisci Vietaei Universalium inspectionum ad Canonem mathematicum liber singularis containing many trigonometric tables and formulas on the sine and cosine, and novel in using a decimal notation; publication continued until 1579.

== Medicine ==
- Peder Sørensen publishes Idea medicinæ philosophicæ in Basel, asserting the superiority of the ideas of Paracelsus to those of Galen.

== Technology ==
- 1571 or 1572 – Jacques Besson publishes his popular comprehensive treatise on machines, Theatrum Instrumentorum.
- The first occurrence of the word theodolite is found in the surveying textbook A geometric practice named Pantometria by Leonard Digges, published posthumously by his son, Thomas.

== Births ==
- December 9 – Metius, Dutch mathematician (died 1635)
- December 27 – Johannes Kepler, German astronomer (died 1630)
- Willem Blaeu, Dutch cartographer (died 1638)
- Frederick de Houtman, Dutch explorer (died 1627)

== Deaths ==
- Bartolomeo Maranta, Italian physician and botanist (born c. 1500)
