= 1568 in science =

The year 1568 in science and technology involved some significant events.

== Botany ==
- Orto Botanico di Bologna botanical garden is created under the direction of Ulisse Aldrovandi.

== Medicine ==
- Ane Breve Descriptioun of the Pest by Gilbert Skene, the first Scottish medical book, is published.

== Births ==
- October 2 – Marin Getaldić, Ragusan mathematician (died 1626)
- date unknown – Nikolaus Ager, French botanist (died 1634)

== Deaths ==
- July 13 – William Turner, English naturalist (born c. 1508)
- Garcia de Orta, Portuguese physician (born c. 1501)
