= 1520 in science =

The year 1520 in science and technology included many events, some of which are listed here.

== Botany ==
- Publication of Le Grant Herbier ("The Great Herbal") in Paris.

== Exploration ==
- November 1–28 – Ferdinand Magellan's fleet makes the first passage of the Strait of Magellan and he names the Pacific Ocean.

== Births ==
- approx. date – Vincenzo Galilei, Italian scientist and musician (died 1591)
- Agatha Streicher, German physician (died 1581)

== Deaths ==
- approx. date – Pedro Álvares Cabral, Portuguese explorer (b. c. 1467/8).
