= 1517 in science =

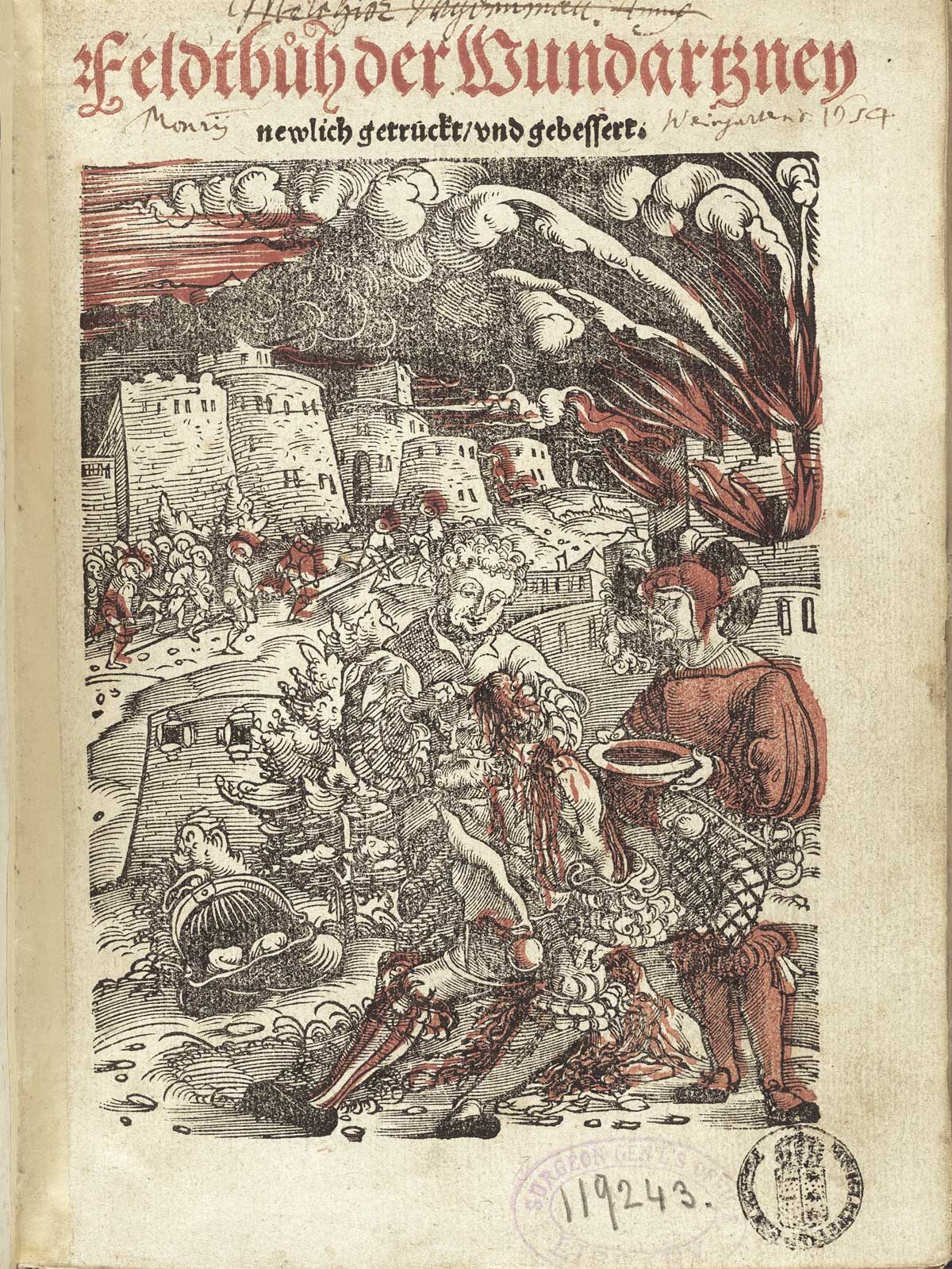
"Feldbuch der Wundarzney" by Hans von Gersdorff

The year 1517 in science and technology included a number of events, some of which are listed here.

== Medicine ==
- A third epidemic of sweating sickness in England hits Oxford and Cambridge.
- German surgeon Hans von Gersdorff publishes his Feldbuch der Wundarzney ("Field book of surgery").

== Births ==
- June 29 – Rembert Dodoens, Flemish physician and botanist (died 1585)
- October 5 – Leonardo Fioravanti, Bolognese physician (died 1588)
- Pierre Belon, French naturalist (died 1564)
- Jacques Pelletier du Mans, French mathematician (died 1582)

== Deaths ==
- Luca Pacioli, Florentine mathematician (b. c.1447)
