= 1591 in science =

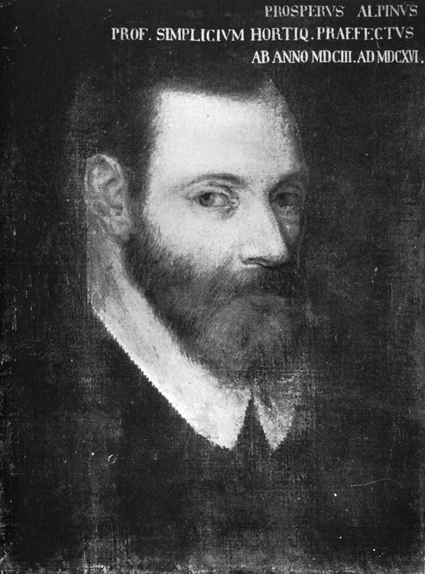
Prospero Alpini, author of De Medicina Egyptiorum

The year 1591 in science and technology included many events, some of which are listed here.

== Mathematics ==
- François Viète publishes In Artem Analyticien Isagoge, introducing the new algebra with innovative use of letters as parameters in equations.
- Giordano Bruno publishes De triplici minimo et mensura, De monade numero et figura and De innumerabilibus, immenso, et infigurabili in Francfort.

== Technology ==
- The Rialto Bridge in Venice, designed by Antonio da Ponte, is completed.

== Publications ==
- Prospero Alpini publishes De Medicina Egyptiorum in Venice, including accounts of coffee, bananas and the baobab.
- Publication of the first of the Conimbricenses commentaries on Aristotle by the Jesuits of the University of Coimbra, Commentarii Collegii Conimbricensis Societatis Jesu in octo libros physicorum Aristotelis Stagyritæ, on Aristotle's Physics.

== Births ==
- February 21 – Gérard Desargues, French geometer (died 1661)

== Deaths ==
- July 2 – Vincenzo Galilei, Italian scientist and musician (born 1520)
