= 1573 in science =

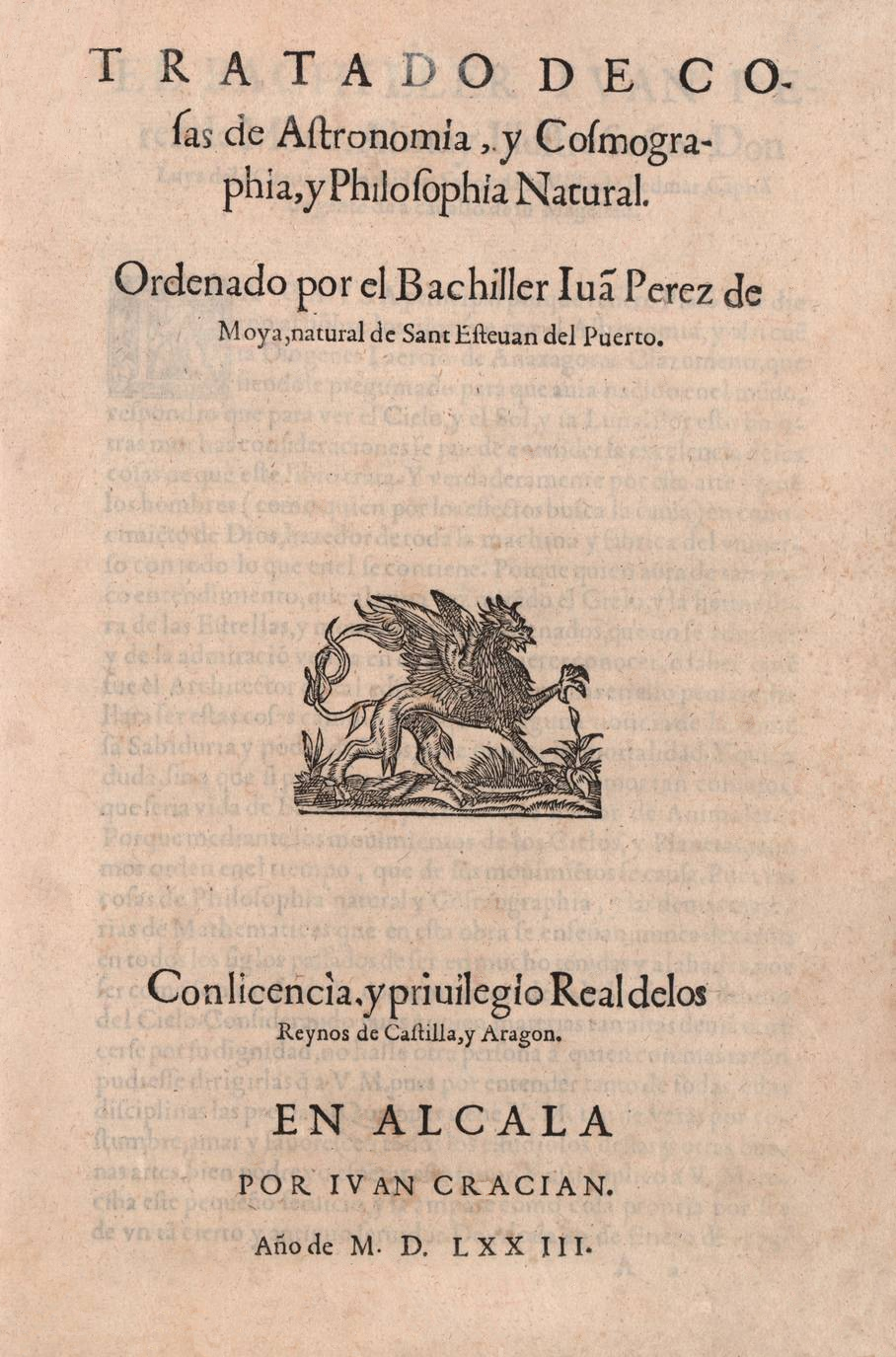
Cover of the book "Treatise on Astronomy, and Cosmographia and Natural Philosophia," published by Juan Pérez de Moya in Alcalá de Henares, in 1573.

The year 1573 in science and technology included many events, some of which are listed here.

== Astronomy ==
- Tycho Brahe publishes De Stella Nova.

== Medicine ==
- Publication of the Chirurgia Magna of Paracelsus, a translation into Latin of his work on surgery, Die grosse Wundartzney (1536), in Basel, allowing its wider dissemination throughout Europe.

== Births ==
- January 10 – Simon Marius, German astronomer who named the Galilean moons of Jupiter (died 1624)
- July 25 – Christoph Scheiner, German astronomer who observed sunspots (died 1650)
- September 28 – Théodore de Mayerne, Swiss-born physician (died 1655)

== Deaths ==
- April 29 – Guillaume Le Testu, French privateer, explorer and cartographer (born c. 1509)
- July 29 – John Caius, English physician and benefactor (born 1510)
