= 1500 in science =

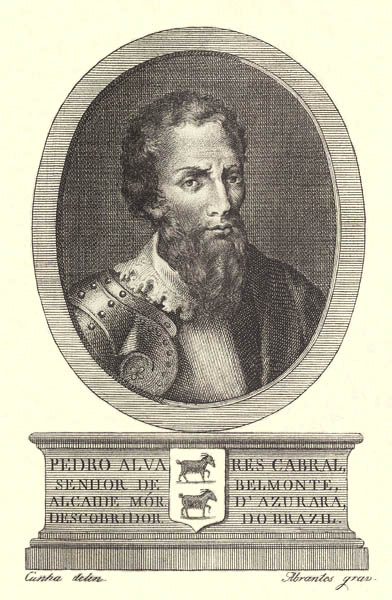
Pedro Álvares Cabral, Portuguese maritime explorer, discoverer of Brazil

The year 1500 AD in science and technology included many events, some of which are listed here.

== Astronomy ==
- June 1–24 – Johannes Werner tracks the movement of a comet. It has been suggested that this was C/1861 J1.
- November 5–6 – Nicolaus Copernicus observes a lunar eclipse from Rome.

== Cartography ==
- Map of Juan de la Cosa, the earliest to show the Americas.
- approx. date – Johannes Stabius introduces the "Werner projection".

== Cryptography ==
- approx. date – Johannes Trithemius of Spanheim writes Steganographia ("hidden writing"). Copies of the manuscript circulate for a hundred years.

== Earth science ==
- Leonardo da Vinci, finding many fossils in canal building sites, proposes that fossil shells of marine animals are found on mountains because Earth undergoes transformations that cause areas once submerged to become exposed.

== Exploration ==
- March 9–April 22 – Expedition of Pedro Álvares Cabral, with thirteen caravels, sails from Lisbon to Brazil, which he claims for Portugal.
- August 10 (St. Lawrence's day) – Diogo Dias becomes the first European to sight the island of Madagascar (which he names São Lourenço).
- Alonso de Ojeda and Amerigo Vespucci return to Spain from their expedition to Venezuela.

== Medicine ==
- approx. date – Jacob Nufer, a Swiss pig gelder, supposedly performs the first recorded successful caesarean section on a living woman.

== Pharmaceutics ==
- Hieronymus Brunschwygk's Liber de arte distillandi de simplicibus, known as the "Small Book (of Distillation)", describes medicinal herbs and the construction of stills for processing them. He will publish his "Big Book", dealing with the same subjects, in 1512.

== Technology ==
- Leonardo da Vinci draws a wheel-lock musket, the first known appearance of this type of ignition, in which a spring mechanism causes a ratchet to strike sparks from iron and pyrites or flint. It will come into use, replacing match ignition, about 15 years later. By this date, he has also designed the first helicopter (although it is probably unworkable).
- Defence of Pisa demonstrates the effectiveness of the trace italienne form of fortification.
- Ottaviano Petrucci (Ottavio de'Petrucci) prints music with movable type in Venice.

== Births ==
- Hernando de Alarcón, Spanish navigator (died 1541)
- Ruy López de Villalobos, Spanish explorer (died 1546)
- approx. date
  - Pierre Desceliers, French cartographer (died 1558)
  - Ambrosius Ehinger, Bavarian explorer of South America (k. 1533)
  - Bartolomeo Maranta, Italian physician and botanist (died 1571)
  - Paarangot Jyeshtadevan Namboodiri, Keralan mathematician and astronomer (died 1610)
  - Niccolò Fontana Tartaglia, Italian mathematician (died 1557)

== Deaths ==
- May 29 – Bartolomeu Dias, Portuguese explorer (b. c. 1451) (drowned at sea)
