= 1516 in science =

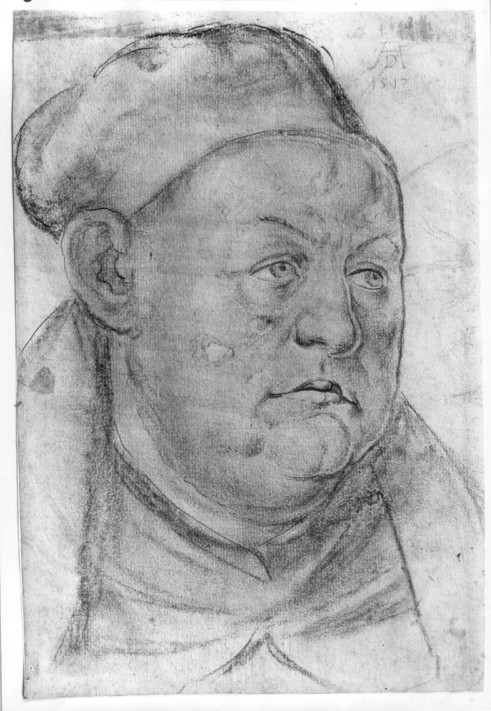
Johannes Trithemius

The year 1516 in science and technology included many events, some of which are listed here.

== Astronomy and space science ==
- The fall of the Nantan meteorite is possibly observed near the city of Nantan, Nandan County, Guangxi (China).

== Exploration ==
- January – The Río de la Plata is first explored by Europeans when Spanish navigator Juan Díaz de Solís traverses it during his search for a passage between the Atlantic and Pacific Oceans.

== Births ==
- March 26 – Conrad Gessner, Swiss naturalist (died 1565)
- November 5 – Martin Helwig, Silesian cartographer (died 1574)
- Realdo Colombo, Italian anatomist (died 1559)

== Deaths ==
- December 13 – Johannes Trithemius, German scholar and cryptographer (born 1462)
