= 1572 in science =

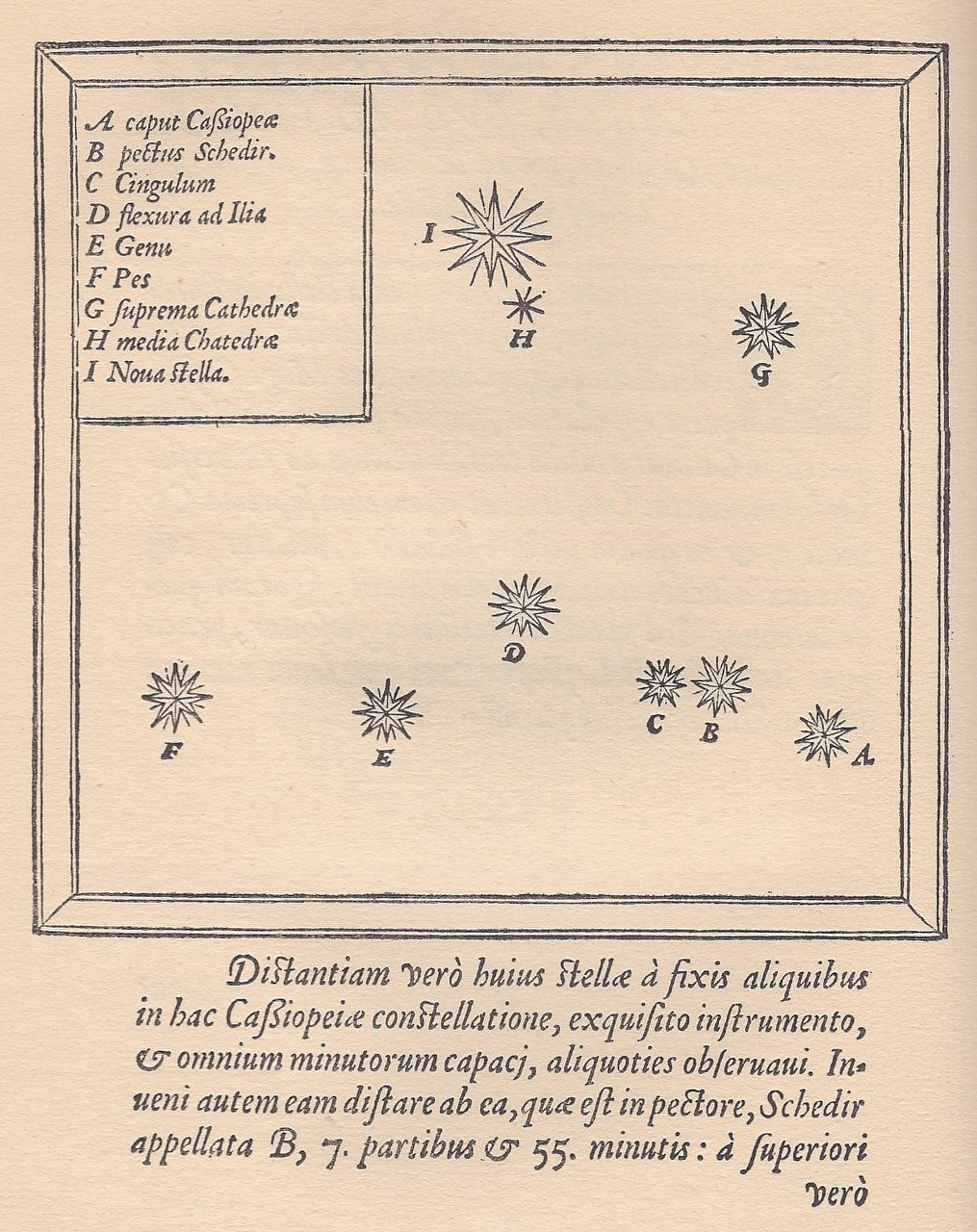
Star map of the constellation Cassiopeia showing the position of the Supernova of 1572.

The year 1572 in science and technology included many events, some of which are listed here.

== Astronomy ==
- November 9 – A supernova, now designated as SN 1572, is first observed in the constellation Cassiopeia by Cornelius Gemma. Tycho Brahe, who notes it two days later, will use it to challenge the prevailing view that stars do not change.

== Cartography ==
- Georg Braun begins publication of his urban atlas Civitates orbis terrarum in Cologne.

== Mathematics ==
- Imaginary numbers defined by Rafael Bombelli.

== Medicine ==
- Girolamo Mercuriale of Forlì (Italy) writes the work De morbis cutaneis ("On the diseases of the skin"), the first scientific tract on dermatology.

== Technology ==
- Mathew Baker appointed Master Shipwright to Queen Elizabeth I of England.

== Births ==
- November 25 – Daniel Sennert, German physician (died 1637)
- Johann Bayer, German uranographer (died 1625)
- Charles Bouvard, French herbalist (died 1658)
- Cornelius Drebbel, Dutch inventor (died 1634)
- Bartholomew Gosnold, English explorer and privateer (died 1607)

== Deaths ==
- August 26 (St. Bartholomew's Day massacre) – Petrus Ramus, French logician (born 1515)
- December 12 – Loredana Marcello, Venetian dogaressa and botanist.
