= 1514 in science =

The year 1514 in science and technology included many events, some of which are listed here.

== Events ==
- June 13 – Henry Grace à Dieu, at over 1,000 tons the largest warship in the world at this time, built at the new Woolwich Dockyard in England, is dedicated.
- The following are established at the Cortile del Belvedere in the Apostolic Palace in Rome under the patronage of Pope Leo X:
  - Leonardo da Vinci, who concentrates on scientific research.
  - Hanno, a white Asian elephant, a gift from King Manuel I of Portugal, which is drawn by Raphael.
- Johannes Werner publishes his translation of Ptolemy's Geography, Nova Translatio Primi Libri Geographicae Cl. Ptolomaei, containing the Werner map projection and proposing use of the cross-staff for marine navigation.

== Births ==
- February 16 – Georg Joachim Rheticus, cartographer and scientific instrument maker (died 1574)
- December 31 – Vesalius, Brabantian anatomist "the father of modern anatomy" (died 1564)
- Francisco Hernández de Toledo, physician and botanist (died 1587)

== Deaths ==
- August 12 – Bartholomew Columbus, Italian navigator (born 1461).
- November 28 – Hartmann Schedel, cartographer (born 1440)
