= 1577 in science =

The following events in the fields of science and technology occurred in the year 1577.

== Astronomy ==
- The Constantinople Observatory of Taqi ad-Din is completed.
- The Great Comet of 1577 is seen. Tycho Brahe is able to discover from his observations that comets and similar objects travel above the Earth's atmosphere.

== Mechanics ==
- Guidobaldo del Monte, Marchese del Monte, publishes Mechanicorum Liber in Pisa.

== Medicine ==
- Publication of John Frampton's Ioyfull newes out of the newe founde worlde, wherein is declared the rare and singular vertues of diuerse and sundrie hearbes, trees, oyles, plantes, and stones, with their applications, as well for phisicke as chirurgerie, an English translation from Nicolás Monardes' Historia medicinal de las cosas que se traen de nuestras Indias Occidentales (1565).

== Technology ==
- English race-built galleon Revenge launched at the Royal Dockyard, Deptford, by Master Shipwright Mathew Baker.

== Births ==
- October 3 – Fortunio Liceti, Italian Aristotelian scientific polymath (died 1657)

== Deaths ==
- Pietro Andrea Mattioli, Italian physician and botanist (born 1501)
- Adam von Bodenstein, Swiss alchemist and physician (born 1528)
