= 1576 in science =

The year 1576 in science and technology included many events, some of which are listed here.

== Astronomy ==
- August 8 – Work begins on Tycho Brahe's Uraniborg observatory on Hven in Øresund.

== Botany ==
- Carolus Clusius publishes Rariorum aliquot stirpium per Hispanias observatarum historia, one of the earliest Floras of the Iberian Peninsula.
- probable date – Leonhard Rauwolf publishes the herbal Viertes Kreutterbuech – darein vil schoene und frembde Kreutter, the earliest Flora of the Near East.

== Exploration ==
- July 11 – English navigator Martin Frobisher sights Greenland.
- August 11 – English navigator Martin Frobisher, on his search for the Northwest Passage, enters the bay now named after him.

== Geophysics ==
- Robert Norman measures magnetic dip.

== Births ==
- Salomon de Caus, French mechanical engineer (died 1626)
- Angelo Sala Italian doctor and early iatrochemist born in Venice (died 1637)

== Deaths ==
- June 2 – Volcher Coiter, Dutch anatomist (born 1534)
- September 21 – Gerolamo Cardano, Italian mathematician and physician (born 1501)
- Richard Eden, English alchemist and translator of geographical works (born c.1520)
