= 1587 in science =

The year 1587 in science and technology included many events, some of which are listed here.

== Exploration ==
- c. March – An edition of Peter Martyr d'Anghiera's De Orbe Novo ("On the New World", 1530) edited by Richard Hakluyt is published in Paris with a new map of the Americas.

== Mathematics ==
- Franciscus Patricius publishes Della nuova geometria in Ferrara.

== Births ==
- January 5 – Xu Xiake, Chinese explorer and geographer (died 1641)
- January 8 – Johannes Fabricius, Frisian astronomer (died 1616)
- October 22 – Joachim Jungius, German mathematician, logician and philosopher of science (died 1657)
- Song Yingxing, Chinese encyclopedist (died 1666)

== Deaths ==
- January 28 – Francisco Hernández de Toledo, Spanish physician and botanist (born 1514)
- Possible date – Humphrey Baker, English arithmetician
