= 1585 in science =

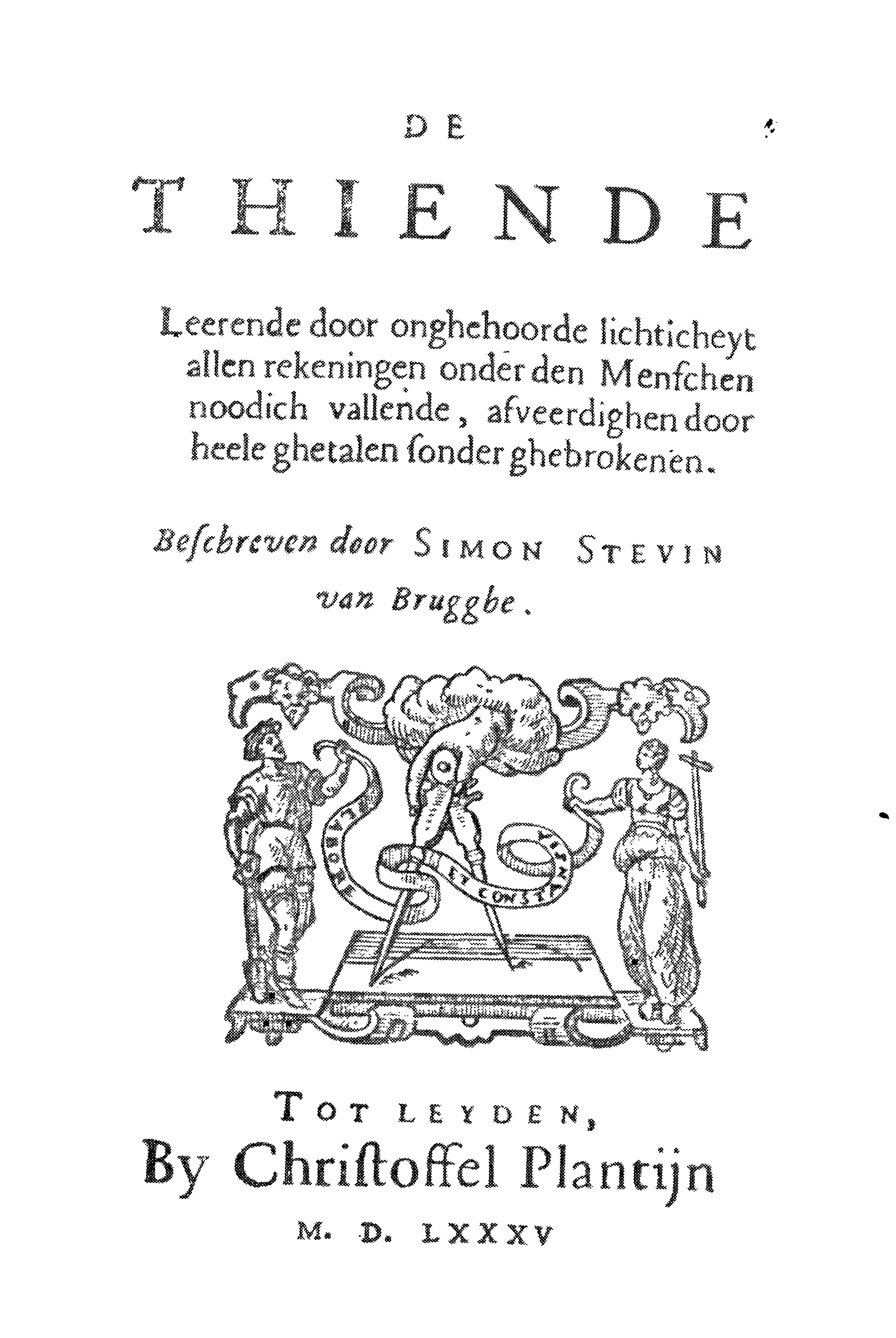
Title page of Stevin's treatise De Thiende "The Tenth,” (1585) best known for popularizing the use of fractions

The year 1585 in science and technology included many events, some of which are listed here.

== Exploration ==
- August 8 – English explorer John Davis enters Cumberland Sound in Baffin Island in his quest for the Northwest Passage.

== Mathematics ==
- John Blagrave publishes The Mathematical Jewel, showing the making and most excellent use of a singular instrument so called, in that it performeth with wonderful dexterity whatever is to be done either by quadrant, ship, circle, cylinder, ring, dial, horoscope, astrolabe, sphere, globe or any such like heretofore devised.
- Giordano Bruno uses Fabrizio Mordente "proportional eight-pointed compass" to refute Aristotle's hypothesis on the incommensurability of infinitesimals, thus confirming the existence of the "minimum" which lays the basis of his own atomic theory. Bruno publishes his proofs as Figuratio Aristotelici Physici auditus.
- Simon Stevin publishes De Thiende, introducing a form of decimal fraction.

== Medicine ==
- Samuel Eisenmenger publishes Cyclopaedia Paracelsica Christiana. Three books of this were the origin and tradition of the liberal arts, also of the physiognomy, above miracles and weather in Brussels.

== Other events ==
- The University of Franeker was founded in the United Provinces of the Netherlands.
- The University of Graz was founded by Charles II, Archduke of Austria.

== Births ==
- February 12 – Caspar Bartholin the Elder, Swedish polymath (died 1629)
- November 1 – Jan Brożek, Polish polymath (died 1652)

== Deaths ==
- March 10 – Rembert Dodoens, Flemish physician and botanist (born 1517)
- Taqi al-Din Muhammad ibn Ma'ruf, Arab astronomer and inventor (born c. 1526)
