= 1586 in science =

The year 1586 in science and technology included a number of events, some of which are listed here.

== Astronomy ==
- The last time Mercury and Venus transit the sun at the same time.

== Botany ==
- Jacques Daléchamps publishes Historia generalis plantarum in Lyon, describing 2,731 plants, a record number for this time.

== Cryptography ==
- Blaise de Vigenère publishes Traicté des chiffres ou secretes manières d'escrire in Paris, describing an autokey cipher of his invention.

== Exploration ==
- July 21 – Thomas Cavendish sets out from Plymouth in the Desire on the first deliberately planned circumnavigation.

== Mathematics ==
- Francesco Barozzi publishes Admirandum illud geometricum problema tredecim modis demonstratum quod docet duas lineas in eodem plano designare, a treatise on the construction of parallel lines.

== Medicine ==
- Timothy Bright publishes A Treatise of Melancholie; containing the causes thereof, & reasons of the strange effects it worketh in our minds and bodies: with the phisicke cure, and spirituall consolation... in London.

== Physics ==
- Galileo publishes La Billancetta, describing an accurate balance to weigh objects in air or water.
- Simon Stevin publishes De Beghinselen der Weeghconst in Leiden, discussing static forces; and De Beghinselen des Waterwichts, discussing the weight of water.

== Zoology ==
- Luis Méndez de Torres's Tratado Breve De La Cultivacion y Cura de las Colmenas ("Short Tractate on the Cultivation and Care of Beehives") first observes that hives have a queen bee and not a king as previously thought.

== Births ==
- February 26 – Niccolò Cabeo, Italian polymath (died 1650)
- December 6 – Niccolò Zucchi, Italian astronomer (died 1670)
- John Mason, English explorer (died 1635)
- Giovanni de Galliano Pieroni, Italian military engineer and astronomer (died 1654)
- approx. date – Guy de La Brosse, French physician and botanist (died 1641)

== Deaths ==
- January 9 – Paul Wittich, German astronomer and mathematician (born c. 1546)
- January 22 - Louis Duret, French physician (born 1527)
- May 29 – Adam Lonicer, German botanist (born 1528)
- June 1 − Martín de Azpilcueta, Spanish theologian and economist (born 1491)
- October 19 – Ignazio Danti, Italian mathematician and astronomer (born 1536)
