= 1504 in science =

The year 1504 in science and technology included a number of events, some of which are listed below.

== Cartography ==
- probable date – Pedro Reinel's Atlantic chart is the earliest known nautical chart with a scale of latitudes, and with a wind rose having a clear fleur-de-lys.

== Exploration ==
- February 29 – Christopher Columbus uses his knowledge of a lunar eclipse this night to convince Jamaican tribesmen to provide him with supplies.
- November 7 – Columbus returns to Spain from his fourth and last voyage, in which he and his younger son, Ferdinand, explored the coast of Central America from Belize to Panama.

== Births ==
- Charles Estienne, French anatomist (died 1564)

== Deaths ==
- June 19 – Bernhard Walther, German astronomer (born 1430).
- exact date unknown – Domenico Maria Novara da Ferrara (born 1454), Italian astronomer.
