= 1508 in science =

The year 1508 in science and technology included a number of events, some of which are listed here.

== Events ==
- approx. date – Leonardo da Vinci completes writing the Codex Leicester.

== Births ==
- December 9 – Gemma Frisius, Dutch mathematician and cartographer (died 1555).
- approx. date – William Turner, English naturalist (died 1568).
