= 1582 in science =

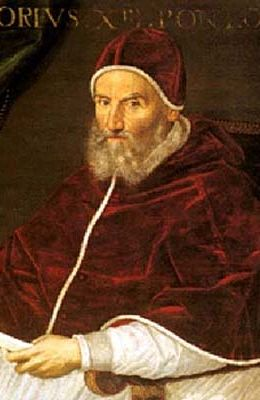
Pope Gregory XIII

The year 1582 in science and technology included a number of events, some of which are listed here. This year sees the introduction of the Gregorian calendar, promulgated by Pope Gregory XIII in the Papal bull Inter gravissimas on February 24 and based largely on the work of Christopher Clavius. Under the Habsburg monarchy in Spain, Portugal and Italy, together with the Polish–Lithuanian Commonwealth, the year continues under the Julian calendar as normal until Thursday October 4, the next day becoming Friday October 15; France follows two months later, letting Sunday December 9 be followed by Monday December 20. Other countries switch in later years.

== Astronomy ==
- Giovanni Antonio Magini publishes the ephemerides Ephemerides coelestium motuum.

== Exploration ==
- Richard Hakluyt publishes Divers Voyages Touching the Discoverie of America and the Ilands Adjacent unto the Same, Made First of all by our Englishmen.

== Medicine ==
- Urbain Hémard investigates the anatomy of the teeth with Recherche de la vraye anathomie des dents, nature et propriété d’icelles.
- Ambroise Paré publishes Discours d'Ambroise Paré : avec une table des plus notables matières contenues esdits discours; De la mumie; De la licorne; Des venins.

== Psychology ==
- Giordano Bruno publishes De umbris idearum (The Shadow of Ideas), Ars Memoriae (The Art of Memory), and Cantus Circaeus (Circe's Song) in Paris.

== Births ==
- John Bainbridge, English astronomer (died 1648)
- Giovanni Battista Baliani, Genoese physicist (died 1666)

== Deaths ==
- Jacques Peletier du Mans, French mathematician (born 1517)
