= 1581 in science =

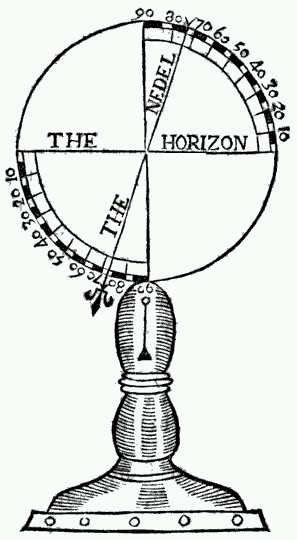
Robert Norman’s dip circle

The year 1581 in science and technology included the following notable events.

== Geophysics ==
- Robert Norman publishes his observations of magnetic dip in The Newe Attractive (London).

== Medicine ==
- Roderigo Lopez becomes the physician-in-chief to Queen Elizabeth I of England until his death by execution, having been found guilty of plotting to poison her.

== Births ==
- October 9 – Claude Gaspard Bachet de Méziriac, French mathematician (died 1638)
- Edmund Gunter, English mathematician (died 1626).
- approximate – Gaspare Aselli, Italian anatomist (died 1626).

== Deaths ==
- Agatha Streicher, German physician (born 1520).
