= 1510 in science =

The year 1510 in science and technology included many events, some of which are listed here.

== Medicine ==
- 1510 Influenza pandemic - Summer – First known influenza pandemic, originating in Asia.

== Technology ==
- Peter Henlein makes the first modern mechanical clock.

== Births ==
- October 6 – John Caius, English physician and benefactor (died 1573)
- Giovanni Filippo Ingrassia, Sicilian anatomist (died 1580).
- Bernard Palissy, French ceramicist and hydraulic engineer (died c. 1589).
- 'Denis Zachaire', French alchemist (died 1556)
- approx. date
  - Ambroise Paré, French surgeon (died 1590).
  - Francisco Vásquez de Coronado, Spanish conquistador (died 1554)

== Deaths ==
- February 28 – Juan de la Cosa, Spanish cartographer and explorer (born c. 1460).
