= 1511 in science =

The year 1511 in science and technology included a number of events, some of which are listed here.

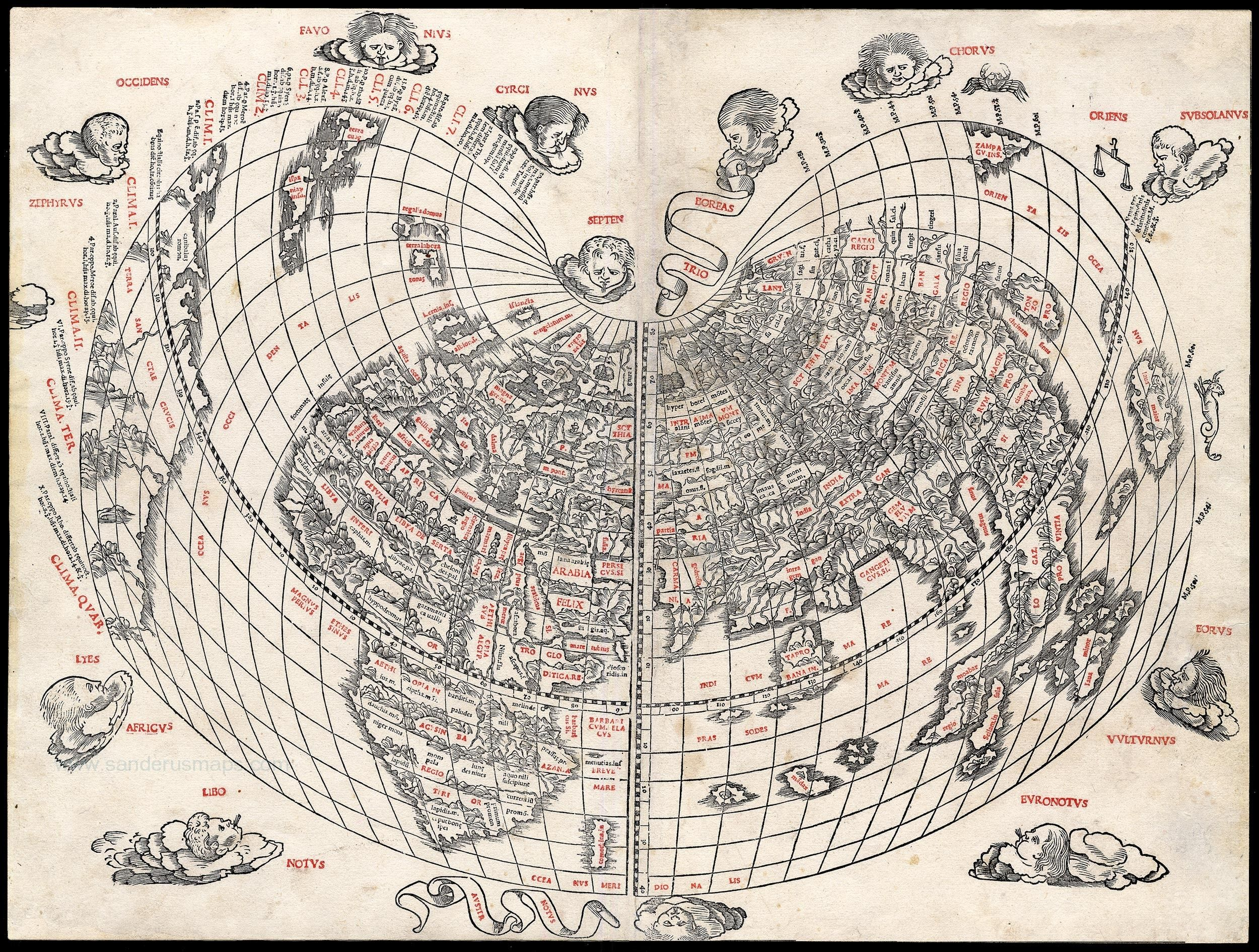
World map by Bernard Sylvanus, 1511

== Cartography ==
- A form of the Bonne projection is used by Sylvano.

== Mathematics ==
- Charles de Bovelles publishes Géométrie en françoys, the first scientific work printed in French.

== Births ==
- September 29(?) – Michael Servetus, Aragonese polymath (died 1553)
- October 22 – Erasmus Reinhold, German astronomer and mathematician (born 1511)

== Deaths ==
- Matthias Ringmann, German geographer (born 1482)
