= 1557 in science =

List of years in science	(table)
- … 1547; 1548; 1549; 1550; 1551; 1552; 1553; 1554; 1555; 1556; 1557; 1558; 1559; 1560; 1561; 1562; 1563; 1564; 1565; 1566; 1567 …
- Art; Archaeology; Architecture; Literature; Music; Philosophy; Science; +...

The year 1557 CE in science and technology included a number of events, some of which are listed here.

== Exploration ==
- Ottoman admiral Seydi Ali Reis writes Mirat ul Memalik ("Mirror of Countries") describing the lands he has seen on his way back from India to Constantinople.
- German adventurer Hans Staden publishes an account of his detention by the Tupí people of Brazil, Warhaftige Historia und beschreibung eyner Landtschafft der Wilden Nacketen, Grimmigen Menschfresser-Leuthen in der Newenwelt America gelegen ("True Story and Description of a Country of Wild, Naked, Grim, Man-eating People in the New World, America"), in Marburg.
- French Franciscan traveller André Thévet publishes Les Singularitez de la France antarctique in Paris describing Brazil and its native plants and animals such as manioc, pineapples, peanuts, tobacco and the macaw, toucan, sloth and tapir.

== Life sciences ==
- French naturalist Pierre Belon publishes Portraicts d’oyseaux, animaux, serpens, herbes, arbres, hommes et femmes d'Arabie et d'Égypte observez par P. Belon du Mans, le tout enrichi de quatrains pour la plus facile cognoissance des Oyseaux et autres portraicts in Paris.
- German botanist Adam Lonicer publishes his revision of Rösslin's herbal, the Kräuterbuch, a large part dealing with distillation.
- English chorister and agriculturalist Thomas Tusser publishes his instructional poem A Hundreth Good Pointes of Husbandrie.

== Mathematics ==
- Welsh-born physician and mathematician Robert Recorde publishes The Whetstone of Witte in London, the first English book on algebra, containing the first recorded use of the equals sign and also the first use in English of plus and minus signs.

== Medicine ==
- August 10 – French surgeon Ambroise Paré, at the Battle of St. Quentin, notes that certain maggots assist the healing of wounds.
- 1557 influenza pandemic spreads worldwide.
- Imperial Italian physician Giulio Alessandrini (a follower of Galen) publishes De medicina et medico dialogus in Zurich.
- Plusquam commentum in parvam Galeni artem by Turisanus Florentinus (died c. 1320) is printed in Venice.

== Metallurgy ==
- First European reference to platinum, in the writings of Italian-born humanist Julius Caesar Scaliger as a description of an unknown noble metal found between Darién and Mexico.

== Births ==
- Cristóbal Lechuga - soldier and mathematician, known to have published a treaty of artillery and fortification.

== Deaths ==
- September 1 – Jacques Cartier, Breton explorer (born 1491)
- December 13 – Niccolò Fontana Tartaglia, Italian mathematician (born 1499/1500)
- probable date – Sebastian Cabot, Venetian explorer (born c. 1474)
