= 1564 in science =

List of years in science	(table)
- … 1554; 1555; 1556; 1557; 1558; 1559; 1560; 1561; 1562; 1563; 1564; 1565; 1566; 1567; 1568; 1569; 1570; 1571; 1572; 1573; 1574 …
- Art; Archaeology; Architecture; Literature; Music; Philosophy; Science; +...

The year 1564 in science and technology included many events, some of which are listed here.

== Medicine ==
- Ambroise Paré publishes his treatise on surgery, Dix livres de la chirurgie: avec le magasin des instrumens necessaires à icelle, in French.

== Births ==
- February 15 – Galileo Galilei, Pisan astronomer (died 1642).
- March 9 – David Fabricius, Frisian astronomer (died 1617).
- approx. date – Pierre Richer de Belleval, French botanist (died 1632).

== Deaths ==
- April – Pierre Belon, French naturalist (born 1517) (murdered)
- October 15 – Vesalius, Flemish anatomist (born 1514)
- October 18 – Johannes Acronius Frisius, German physician and mathematician (born 1520)
- Charles Estienne, French anatomist (born 1504)
