= 1565 in science =

List of years in science	(table)
- … 1555; 1556; 1557; 1558; 1559; 1560; 1561; 1562; 1563; 1564; 1565; 1566; 1567; 1568; 1569; 1570; 1571; 1572; 1573; 1574; 1575 …
- Art; Archaeology; Architecture; Literature; Music; Philosophy; Science; +...

The year 1565 in science and technology included many events, some of which are listed here.

== Earth sciences ==
- Conrad Gessner publishes De omni rerum fossilium genere, gemmis, lapidibus, metallis, et huiusmod in Zürich.

== Medicine ==
- College of Physicians of London empowered to carry out human dissections.
- The first hospital in the Philippines is established by the Spanish in Cebu.
- First publication of Dos libros ... (Historia medicinal de las cosas que se traen de nuestras Indias Occidentales or "Medical study of the products imported from our West Indian possessions") by Spanish physician and botanist Nicolás Monardes.

== Technology ==
- October – The first Martello tower, the Torra di Mortella, designed by Giovan Giacomo Paleari Fratino (el Fratin), is completed as part of the Genovese defence system at Mortella (Myrtle) Point in Upper Corsica.
- Roger Taverner writes his Arte of surveyinge.

== Births ==
- April 2 – Cornelis de Houtman, Dutch explorer (died 1599)
- November 10 – Laurentius Paulinus Gothus, Swedish theologian and astronomer (died 1646)
- Pedro Fernandes de Queirós, navigator (died 1614)

== Deaths ==
- December 13 – Conrad Gessner, Swiss naturalist (born 1516)
