= 1563 in science =

List of years in science	(table)
- … 1553; 1554; 1555; 1556; 1557; 1558; 1559; 1560; 1561; 1562; 1563; 1564; 1565; 1566; 1567; 1568; 1569; 1570; 1571; 1572; 1573 …
- Art; Archaeology; Architecture; Literature; Music; Philosophy; Science; +...

The year 1563 in science and technology included a number of events, some of which are listed here.

== Medicine and physiology ==
- June–October – Outbreak of bubonic plague in London kills over 20,000.
- Bartolomeo Eustachi publishes De Renibus (including his discovery of the adrenal glands) and Libellus De Dentibus (in Venice), a pioneering text on dentition.
- Garcia de Orta publishes Colóquios dos simples e drogas da India in Goa, the first text in a Western language on tropical medicine and drugs, including a classic description of cholera.
- Felix Würtz publishes his critical treatise on surgery, Praktika der Wundartzney, in Basel.

== Publications ==
- prob. date – Bernardino Telesio – De Rerum Natura Iuxta Propria Principia.

== Births ==
- October 14 – Jodocus Hondius, Flemish cartographer (died 1612)
- Louise Bourgeois Boursier, French Royal midwife (died 1638)
- Yi Su-gwang, Korean scholar-bureaucrat (died 1628)
- Walter Warner, English scientist (died 1643)
- approx. date
  - Oswald Croll, German iatrochemist (died 1609)
  - William Lee, English inventor (died 1614)
