= 1561 in science =

List of years in science	(table)
- … 1551; 1552; 1553; 1554; 1555; 1556; 1557; 1558; 1559; 1560; 1561; 1562; 1563; 1564; 1565; 1566; 1567; 1568; 1569; 1570; 1571 …
- Art; Archaeology; Architecture; Literature; Music; Philosophy; Science; +...

The year 1561 in science and technology included a number of events, some of which are listed here.

== Cartography and navigation ==
- Bartolomeu Velho produces a Carta General do Orbe for Sebastian of Portugal.
- Richard Eden translates Martín Cortés de Albacar's Arte de navigar as The Arte of Navigation which becomes the first manual of navigation in English.

== Medicine and physiology ==
- Gabriele Falloppio publishes Observationes anatomicae in Venice, the only work of his printed during his lifetime.
- Ambroise Paré publishes Anatomie universelle du corps humain and La méthode curative des playes et fractures de la test humaine in Paris.
- Smallpox epidemic in Chile.

== Births ==
- January 6 – Thomas Fincke, Danish mathematician (died 1656)
- January 22 – Francis Bacon, English philosopher of science (died 1626)
- March 29 – Sanctorius, Istrian physiologist (died 1636)
- August 4 – John Harington, English inventor (died 1612)
- August 24 – Bartholomaeus Pitiscus, German trigonometrist (died 1613)
- August 25 – Philippe van Lansberge, Flemish astronomer (died 1632)
- September 29 – Adriaan van Roomen, Flemish mathematician (died 1615)
- October 8 (bapt.) – Edward Wright, English mathematician (died 1615)
