= 1560 in science =

List of years in science	(table)
- … 1550; 1551; 1552; 1553; 1554; 1555; 1556; 1557; 1558; 1559; 1560; 1561; 1562; 1563; 1564; 1565; 1566; 1567; 1568; 1569; 1570 …
- Art; Archaeology; Architecture; Literature; Music; Philosophy; Science; +...

The year 1560 in science and technology included a number of events, some of which are listed here.

== Events ==
- The first scientific society, the Academia Secretorum Naturae, is founded in Naples by Giambattista della Porta.

== Astronomy ==
- August 21 – A total solar eclipse is observable in Europe.

== Biology ==
- The Old Botanical Garden, Zurich, originates as Conrad Gessner's private herbarium.

== Births ==
- January 17 – Gaspard Bauhin, Swiss botanist (died 1624)
- June 25 – Wilhelm Fabry, German surgeon (died 1634)
- undated – Charles Butler, English beekeeper (died 1647)
- approx date
  - Thomas Harriot, English ethnographer, astronomer and mathematician (died 1621)
  - Hugh Myddelton, Welsh-born goldsmith and hydraulic engineer (died 1631)

== Deaths ==
- William Shakespeare's grandfather; Richard Shakespeare died from natural causes, on 23 April.
- November 15 − Domingo de Soto, Spanish priest and philosopher.
