= 1559 in science =

List of years in science	(table)
- … 1549; 1550; 1551; 1552; 1553; 1554; 1555; 1556; 1557; 1558; 1559; 1560; 1561; 1562; 1563; 1564; 1565; 1566; 1567; 1568; 1569 …
- Art; Archaeology; Architecture; Literature; Music; Philosophy; Science; +...

The year 1559 in science and technology included a number of events, some of which are listed here.

== Botany ==
- First account of tulips in western Europe, by Conrad Gessner who describes them flowering in Augsburg, Bavaria, in the garden of Councillor Herwart.

== Exploration ==
- March – Juan Fernández Ladrillero completes a double transit of the Straits of Magellan from the west.
- August 15 – Led by Don Tristán de Luna y Arellano, a Spanish missionary colony of 1500 men on thirteen ships arrives from Vera Cruz at Pensacola Bay, founding the first European settlement on the mainland United States. On September 19, the colony is decimated by a hurricane.
- Secondo volume delle Navigationi et Viaggi nel quale si contengono l'Historia delle cose de' Tartari, et diuversi fatti de loro Imperatori, descritta da M. Marco Polo, Gentilhuomo di Venezia, edited by Giovanni Battista Ramusio, is published posthumously in Venice, the first scholarly edition of The Travels of Marco Polo.

== Pharmacology ==
- Jacques Besson publishes his first treatise, in Zurich, De absoluta ratione extrahendi olea et aquas e medicamentis simplicibus ("on the complete doctrine of extracting oils and waters from simple drugs"), with an introduction by Conrad Gessner, before moving to Geneva.

== Physiology and medicine ==
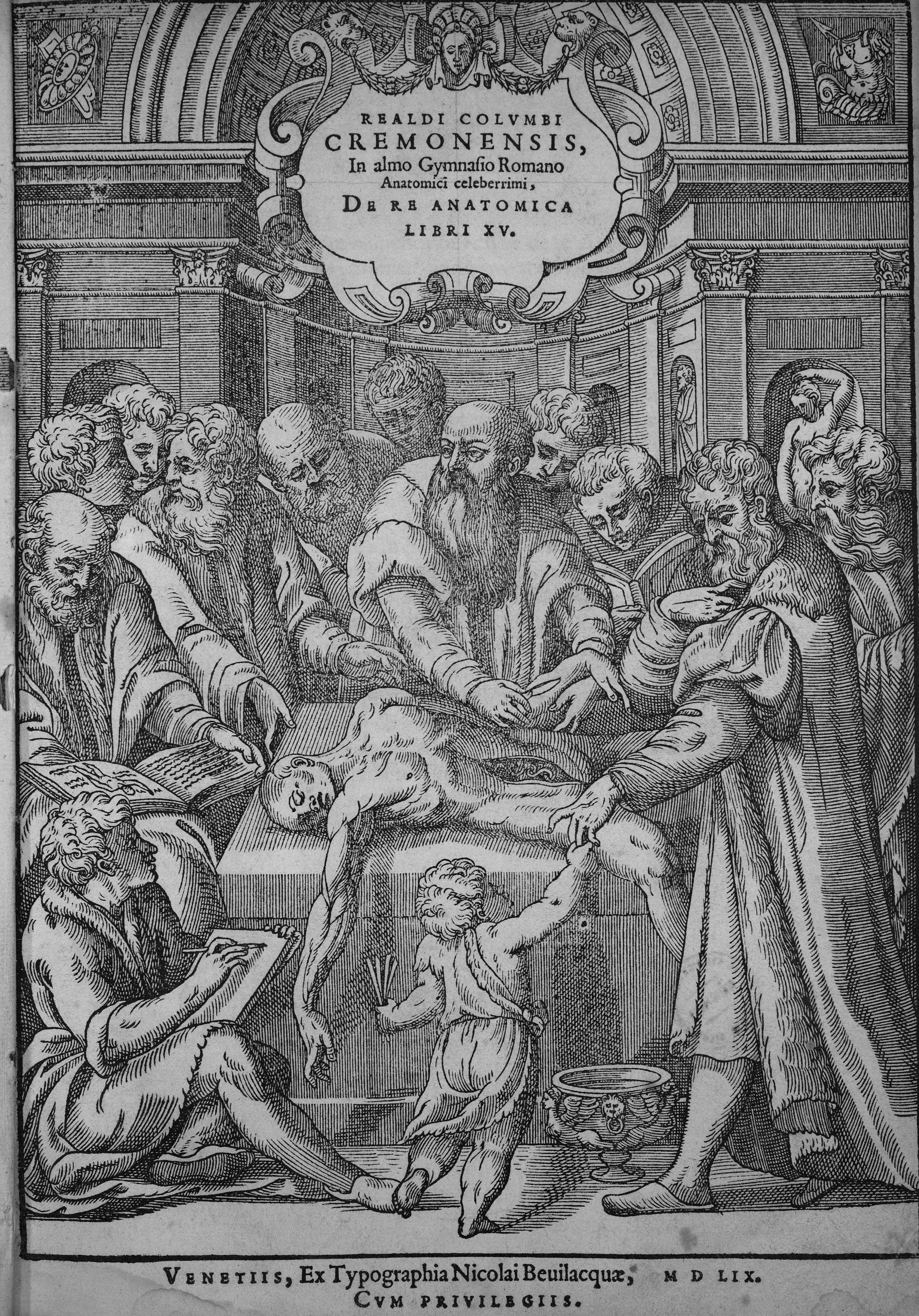
De re anatomica

- Shortly before his death, Italian anatomist Realdo Colombo publishes his only work De Re Anatomica, including his discovery of pulmonary circulation, of the clitoris and of the position and posture of the human embryo.
- Jean Nicot, French ambassador to Portugal 1559–61, describes the medicinal properties of tobacco which he introduces in the form of snuff to the French court.

== Deaths ==
- March 30 - Adam Ries, German mathematician (born 1492)
- Realdo Colombo, Italian anatomist (born 1516)
- approx. date - Leonard Digges, English mathematician and surveyor (born c. 1515)
