= 1569 in science =

List of years in science	(table)
- … 1559; 1560; 1561; 1562; 1563; 1564; 1565; 1566; 1567; 1568; 1569; 1570; 1571; 1572; 1573; 1574; 1575; 1576; 1577; 1578; 1579 …
- Art; Archaeology; Architecture; Literature; Music; Philosophy; Science; +...

The year 1569 in science and technology included a number of events, some of which are listed here.

== Astronomy ==
- A lunar eclipse is observed by Cornelius Gemma.

== Cartography ==
- The Mercator projection is first used in Gerardus Mercator's world map Nova et Aucta Orbis Terrae Descriptio ad Usum Navigantium Emendata.

== Chemistry ==
- Paracelsus' major text on chemistry, Archidoxa, is published posthumously in Kraków in Latin translation by Adam Schröter.

== Physiology and medicine ==
- Girolamo Mercuriale publishes De Arte Gymnastica in Venice, covering the ancient history and current practice of physical exercise.

== Economics ==
- Tomás de Mercado publishes De los tratos de India y tratantes en ellas, linking the Price revolution to the influx of American gold.

== Publications ==
- Cornelius Gemma publishes De arte cyclognomica in Antwerp.

== Births ==
- Muzio Oddi, Italian mathematician (died 1639)
- 2 November – Epifanio Ferdinando, Italian physician (died 1638)
