= 1554 in science =

| List of years in science | (table) |
- … 1544; 1545; 1546; 1547; 1548; 1549; 1550; 1551; 1552; 1553; 1554; 1555; 1556; 1557; 1558; 1559; 1560; 1561; 1562; 1563; 1564 …
- Art; Archaeology; Architecture; Literature; Music; Philosophy; Science; +...

The year 1554 CE in science and technology included a number of events, some of which are listed here.

== Astronomy ==
- Flemish astronomer Johannes Stadius' first published work, Ephemerides novae at auctae, appears in Cologne

== Biology ==
- Bolognese naturalist Ulisse Aldrovandi creates a herbarium.
- Flemish herbalist Rembert Dodoens publishes his herbal Cruydt-Boeck in Antwerp.
- The guinea pig is first described in the West by Swiss naturalist Conrad Gessner.
- French physician Guillaume Rondelet begins publication of Libri de piscibus marinis in Lyon, a standard work on marine zoology.
- Hippolito Salviani begins publication of Aquatilium animalium historiae in Rome, a foundation of modern ichthyology.
- French anatomist Charles Estienne publishes a collection of tracts on agriculture, Praedium Rusticum.

== Exploration ==
- November – English captain John Lok voyages to Guinea.
- French Franciscan voyager André Thévet publishes his account of an embassy to Constantinople in Cosmographie de Levant (Lyon).

== Metallurgy ==
- Spanish merchant Bartolomé de Medina introduces the patio process, using mercury amalgamation to extract silver from ore, in Pachuca, New Spain (Mexico).

== Physics ==
- Venetian mathematician Giambattista Benedetti publishes two editions of Demonstratio proportionum motuum localium, developing his new doctrine of the speed of bodies in free fall.

== Technology ==
- Completion of the Church of Sant'Andrea in Via Flaminia, Rome, designed by Giacomo Barozzi da Vignola, the first church of the Italian Renaissance to have an elliptical dome.

== Births ==
- March 22 – Catherine de Parthenay, French noblewoman and mathematician (died 1631)
- November – Jakob Christmann, German orientalist and astronomer (died 1613)
- Probable date
  - James Lancaster, English navigator (died 1618)
  - Walter Ralegh, English explorer (died 1618)

== Deaths ==
- February 21 – Hieronymus Bock, German botanist (born 1498)
- September 22 – Francisco Vásquez de Coronado, Spanish conquistador (born c. 1510)
- Tan Yunxian, Chinese physician (born 1461)
- unknown date – Sir Hugh Willoughby, English explorer (in the Arctic Sea)
