= 1556 in science =

List of years in science	(table)
- … 1546; 1547; 1548; 1549; 1550; 1551; 1552; 1553; 1554; 1555; 1556; 1557; 1558; 1559; 1560; 1561; 1562; 1563; 1564; 1565; 1566 …
- Art; Archaeology; Architecture; Literature; Music; Philosophy; Science; +...

The year 1556 CE in science and technology included a number of events, some of which are listed here.

== Astronomy and earth sciences ==
- January 23 – Shaanxi earthquake in China.
- February – Great Comet of 1556 becomes visible in Europe.
- Publication of Georgius Agricola's textbook on metal mining and processing, De re metallica (posthumously, at Basel).
- Minas de Ríotinto in Huelva, Andalusia, rediscovered.

== Life sciences ==
- Publication in Rome of Juan Valverde de Amusco's Historia de la composicion del cuerpo humano, including Realdo Colombo's discovery of pulmonary circulation.
- Publication of the standard reference work on marine animals, Libri de piscibus marinis in quibus verae piscium effigies expressae sunt by Guillaume Rondelet, Chancellor of the University of Montpellier; his anatomical drawing of a sea urchin is the earliest extant depiction of an invertebrate. Rondelet's Methodus de materia medicinali et compositione medicamentorum Palavii is also published.
- Cholera outbreak in Oran.

== Births ==
- February 21 – Sethus Calvisius, German musician and astronomer (died 1615)
- August 24 – Sophia Brahe, Danish astronomer (died 1643)

== Deaths ==
- November 10 – Richard Chancellor, English Arctic explorer (drowned at sea) (born c. 1521)
- 'Denis Zachaire', French alchemist (born 1520)
