= 1567 in science =

List of years in science	(table)
- … 1557; 1558; 1559; 1560; 1561; 1562; 1563; 1564; 1565; 1566; 1567; 1568; 1569; 1570; 1571; 1572; 1573; 1574; 1575; 1576; 1577 …
- Art; Archaeology; Architecture; Literature; Music; Philosophy; Science; +...

The year 1567 in science and technology included a number of events, some of which are listed here.

== Astronomy ==
- Jean-Antoine de Baïf publishes Le Premier des Météores, a didactic poem on astronomy, in France.

== Mathematics ==
- Fabrizio Mordente (1532 – ca 1608) publishes a single sheet treatise in Venice showing illustrations of his "proportional eight-pointed compass" which has two arms with cursors that allow the solution of problems in measuring the circumference, area and angles of a circle.

== Medicine ==
- Paracelsus publishes On the Miners' Sickness and Other Diseases of Miners, a pioneering example of occupational medicine.

== Births ==
- John Parkinson, English herbalist and botanist (died 1650)

== Deaths ==
- April 19 - Michael Stifel, German mathematician (born c. 1487)
