= 1566 in science =

| List of years in science | (table) |
- … 1556; 1557; 1558; 1559; 1560; 1561; 1562; 1563; 1564; 1565; 1566; 1567; 1568; 1569; 1570; 1571; 1572; 1573; 1574; 1575; 1576 …
- Art; Archaeology; Architecture; Literature; Music; Philosophy; Science; +...

The year 1566 in science and technology included many events, some of which are listed here.

== Biology ==
- Rembert Dodoens publishes Frumentorum, leguminum, palustrium et aquatilium herbarum, ac eorum quae eo pertinent historia at Antwerp.

== Civil engineering ==
- 1566–67 – Completion of "Stari Most" bridge crossing the Neretva at Mostar by the Ottoman Empire (builder: Mimar Hayruddin).
- Autumn – Probable completion of the Exeter Canal, the first in England, and with the first use of a pound lock in England (engineer: John Trew of Glamorgan).

== Navigation ==
- Pedro Nunes' work on navigation, Petri Nonii Salaciensis Opera, is published.

== Events ==
- December 29 – Danish astronomer Tycho Brahe, while studying at the University of Rostock in Mecklenburg, loses part of his nose in a duel with fellow nobleman and relation Manderup Parsberg over a mathematical formula.

== Births ==
- Giuseppe Biancani, Italian astronomer (died 1624)
- Jan Jesenius, Slovak physician (died 1621)
- Michal Sedziwój, Polish alchemist (died 1636)
- Caterina Vitale, Maltese pharmacist (died 1619)

== Deaths ==
- May 4 – Luca Ghini, Italian physician and botanist (born 1490)
- May 10 – Leonhart Fuchs, German botanist (born 1501)
- July 2 – Nostradamus, French physician and astrologer (born 1503)
- July 30 – Guillaume Rondelet, French physician (born 1507)
