= Miguel Ángel =

Miguel Ángel may refer to:

- Miguel Ángel (given name)
- Miguel Ángel (footballer, born 1947), Spanish football goalkeeper
- Miguel Ángel (footballer, born 1978), Spanish football manager and defensive midfielder
- Miguel Ángel (footballer, born 1993), Spanish football winger for Gubbio
- Miguel Ángel (footballer, born 1996), Spanish football right-back
- Miguel Ángel (footballer, born March 1998), Spanish football defender for Getafe
- Miguel Ángel (footballer, born May 1998), Spanish football forward for Albacete

== See also ==
- Michelangelo (disambiguation)
