= Lechuga =

Lechuga is a Spanish surname. It is occupational in origin and was used for a grower or seller of lettuces, lechuga being the Spanish word for "lettuce", "salad". Notable people with the surname include:

- Antonio Lechuga (born 1988), Spanish footballer
- Cristobal Lechuga (1557–1622), Spanish military engineer
- Héctor Lechuga (1927–2017), Mexican actor, comedian, political commentarist and radio personality
- José Ignacio Pichardo Lechuga (born 1966), Mexican politician
- Kenia Lechuga (born 1994), Mexican rower
- Laura Lechuga, Spanish microbiologist
- Pablo Lechuga (born 1990), Spanish racing cyclist
- Raúl Lucio Hernández Lechuga, former Mexican drug lord
- Ruth D. Lechuga (1920–2004), Austrian-born collector of Mexican folk art
- Scotti Lechuga (born 1983), American former racing cyclist
- Víctor Lechuga (born 1966), Guatemalan former cyclist
