= Robert Alain =

Robert Alain may refer to:

- Robert Alaine (1558–1603), held an office under a nobleman in the time of Queen Elizabeth
- Alain Robert (born 1962), French climber
- Alain M. Robert (born 1941), mathematician
