= Miguel Ángel (given name) =

Miguel Ángel (IPA: [miˈɣel ˈaŋxel]) is a Spanish masculine given name, a combination of the names Miguel and Ángel, often used in reference to the archangel Michael.

== People ==
- Miguel Ángel Albizures, Guatelamalan human rights activist
- Miguel Ángel Álvarez, Puerto Rican comedian sopla poller
- Miguel Ángel Asturias, Guatemalan Nobel-prize winning writer and diplomat
- Miguel Ángel Benítez Pavón, Paraguayan retired footballer
- Miguel Ángel Blanco, Spanish politician
- Miguel Angel Dominguez, Paraguayan soccer player
- Miguel Ángel Estrella, Argentine pianist
- Miguel Angel Gamondi, Argentine football manager
- Miguel Ángel Guerra, Argentine racing driver
- Miguel Ángel Hoyo, Spanish basketball coach
- Miguel Ángel Jiménez, Spanish golfer
- Miguel Ángel Loayza, Peruvian footballer
- Miguel Ángel Lozano, Spanish footballer
- Miguel Ángel Mancera, Mexican politician
- Miguel Ángel Muñoz, Spanish actor and singer
- Miguel Ángel Nadal, Spanish footballer
- Miguel Ángel Oca, Spanish water polo player
- Miguel Ángel Osorio Chong, Mexican politician
- Miguel Angel Onzari, Argentine footballer
- Miguel Ángel Pichetto, Argentine politician
- Miguel Ángel Quevedo, Cuban journalist
- Miguel Ángel Raimondo, Argentine footballer
- Miguel Angel Reyes, American artist
- Miguel Ángel Rodríguez, Costa Rican politician
- Miguel Ángel Ruiz, Mexican author
- Miguel Ángel Silvestre, Spanish actor
- Miguel Ángel Yunes Linares, Mexican politician
- Miguel Ángel Yunes Márquez, Mexican politician
