= Pitati =

Pitati may refer to:

- Pítati, a contingent of archers in the Egyptian Empire
- Bonifazio de' Pitati, better known as Bonifazio Veronese (1487–1553), Italian painter
- Pietro Pitati (died c. 1550), Italian astronomer and mathematician
