= Onzari =

Onzari is a surname. Notable people with the surname include:

- Cesáreo Onzari (1903–1964), Argentine footballer
- Miguel Ángel Onzari (born 1951), Argentine retired footballer
