= Marta Turok =

Mexican anthropologist

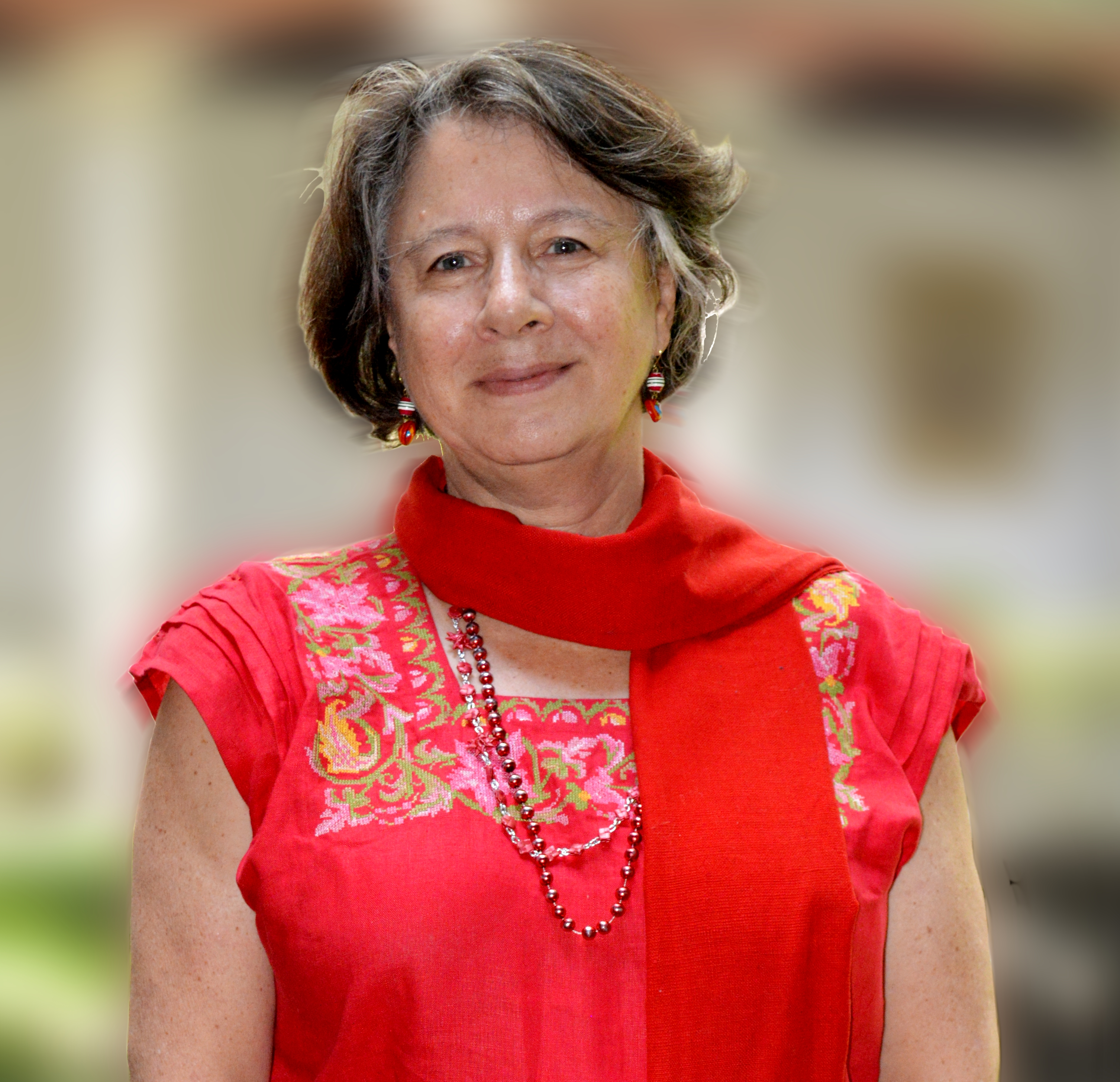
- Turok at the Museo de Arte Popular in Mexico City
- Born: Marta Turok Wallace; 1952 (age 72–73); Mexico City
- Occupation: anthropologist
- Years active: 1974 - present
- Known for: promotion of Mexican handcrafts and folk art

Marta Turok (full name Marta Turok Wallace; born 1952) is a Mexican applied anthropologist focusing on socio-economic development, and one of the foremost schools on Mexican folk art. Through research, government work, education and advocacy, she has worked to raise the prestige of Mexican handcrafts and folk art and to help artisans improve their economic status. Her work has been recognized with awards from various governmental and non-governmental agencies.

== Life and education ==
Turok was born to American parents, with both growing up in the Boston area. After World War II, they decided to move to Mexico City, with her older brother, Kipi, where they started a postcard business. Marta was born in 1952, with another brother, Antonio, coming after. Here they were raised, and Marta grew up bicultural and bilingual, attending the English-language American School in Mexico City.

Turok decided to go to the United States to do her undergraduate degree, attended Tufts University, where her father had studied chemistry. The university allowed undergraduates to design their own course of study, which she took advantage of as they did not yet have an anthropology program. She chose to do a comprehensive senior thesis, traveling to Chiapas to research handcrafts there. There she worked with anthropologist Walter Morris, Jr., where the two decided to research the history and possible meanings being traditional design elements in Mayan handwoven cloth. This concept was completely new at the time, and subsequent research proved the concept correct, that the elements did indeed have meanings at one time, but most have been lost. During this time, she learned to speak Tzotzil and weave on a backstrap loom. Turok graduated in 1974, with a degree in anthropology and socioeconomics.

Later, she studied ethnology at the National Autonomous University of Mexico, graduating in 1978, and in 1996, received a certificate in marketing from the University of California Berkeley.

== Careerthe original ==
Instead of using her research in Chiapas to start an academic career, she opted to follow a more pragmatic path, helping artisans improve their economic situation, promoting the cultural value of handcrafts and folk art, training artisans in marketing and working with collectors, museum curators and the general public.

Turok began her career working for a number of government agencies and teaching classes on traditional Mexican textile design. Her government work focused on public policy to raise the status of handcrafts. She has worked with the National Indigenous Institute, and the Fondo Nacional para el Fomento de las Artesanías (FONART), where as subdirector of social programs, created the policy guideline to distinguish handcrafts with artistic and cultural value.

In 1988, she was the executive director of the Dirección General de Culturas Populares (Popular Cultures Bureau), the youngest women named to a senior post in the Ministry of Education. During her time there, it grew from 300 to 800 employees, with 17 regional offices. She established the Mexican Sport Confederation as a national entity, with supports the preservation of pre Hispanic sports and games. The agency also included the publishing of books related to folk art and popular culture, with topics such as s purpura, a dye made from a sea snail, organ grinders and charro music from northern Mexico. She also developed a project to preserve weaving and sewing traditions in numerous indigenous communities, providing fabric, embroidery thread and sewing needles.

In the late 1980s, Turok decided to transition from government work to that in the non-profit sector. She founded the Asociacíon Mexicana de Arte y Cultura Popular (AMACUP) or Mexican Association of Popular Art and Culture in 1989, which focuses on developing contemporary products using traditional techniques. It also works to ensure that this handcraft production is both economically and environmentally sustainable. It has brought goods to new markets, especially international specialty stores and museum gift catalogs, as well as the major Mexican tourist centers of Cancún, Los Cabos, Cozumel and Puerto Vallarta. She remained president of the association from its founding until 2012.

In the 2010s, she was the head of CENIDEART, the Research Center at the Escuela de Artesanías (School of Handcrafts) of the National Institute of Fine Arts. Today, she is the curator for the Ruth D. Lechuga folk art collection at the Franz Mayer Museum. With the Escuela de Artesanías she worked with accrediting handcraft traditions for the Secretariat of Public Education, as well as did research. With the Franz Mayer Museum she has curated exhibits such as Traditions, Mexican Popular Arts (SUNY/Albany 1992), Lacas Mexicanas (1997), El Juguete en México (1998), Cerámica de Mata Ortiz (1999), El Sarape de Saltillo (2003), 1001 Rostros de México: máscaras de la colección de Ruth D. Lechuga (2010) and El Arte Popular de Hidalgo: rituales, usos y creaciones October 2010 – March 2011.

Turok also worked as a co-curator for the exhibition Grupo de Grabadores Mixtecos Unidos, A.C. as part of the Living Earth Festival of the Museum of the American Indian (Smithsonian, 2011) and with the Centro de las Artes Indígenas del Tajín, worked to form the Museógrafos Totonacas. In addition, she has trained artisans in marketing and the environment and for 40 years has served as a judge in Mexican craft contests, such as those sponsored by the Friends of Oaxacan Folk Art in New York. She is still active academically; giving conferences on topics related to Mexican handcrafts and folk art and has taught seminars and courses. In 2016, Turok and Margarita de Orellana became the co-executors of the collection of more than 20,000 artifacts, books and personal items donated by Ruth D. Lechuga to the Franz Mayer Museum.

Turok's work has earned her various recognitions including the National Contest Award of First Place in Marketable Products, a First Place Mexico City Export Prize for Crafts Export Enterprises and honorary mention with the Instituto Nacional de Antropología e Historia Prize, the Miguel Covarrubias Prize, the Música por la Tierra Prize, AMACUP Marketable Crafts Award, UNESCO De Facto Award for Innovation in Crafts for Mexico and Latin America and the Van Deren Coke Award of the Los Amigos del Arte Popular.

== Publications ==
Turok has published numerous articles, especially for the publication Artes de México such as an essay on Metepec for Ceramic Trees of Life. Book publications include:

- Como Acercarse a la Artesanía
- El caracol púrpura: una tradición milenaria en Oaxaca
- Fiestas Mexicanas
- Cerámica de Mata Ortiz
- El Ropero de Frida
- El Sarape de Saltillo
- Museo del Sarape y Traje Mexicano de Saltillo, Coahuila (museum guide)
