= Epifanio Ferdinando =

Italian physician

Doctor of Medicine Epifanio Ferdinando
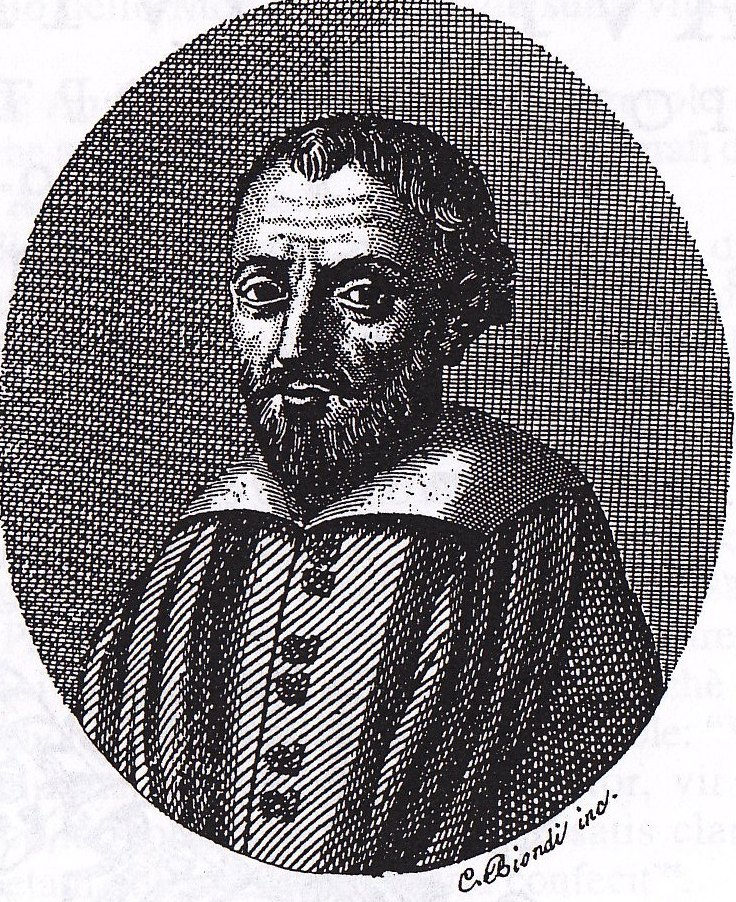
- Born: 2 November 1569; Mesagne, Kingdom of Naples
- Died: 6 December 1638 (aged 69); Mesagne, Kingdom of Naples
- Occupation: Physician
- Spouse: Giordana Longo-Pecoraro (m. 1597)
- Children: 10
- Parent(s): Matteo Ferdinando and Camilla Ferdinando (née Rini)

Academic background
- Education: University of Naples Federico II
- Influences: Hippocrates; Galen; Girolamo Fracastoro

Academic work
- Discipline: Physician
- Influenced: Athanasius Kircher

Epifanio Ferdinando (1569–1638) was an Italian physician of the Renaissance. He is known to medical historians for his detailed discussion of tarantism.

== Biography ==
Epifanio Ferdinando was born in Mesagne, in the Terra di Otranto, on 2 November 1569. He cultivated the study of the Latin and Greek poets at an early age, and wrote elegant verses in both these languages. In 1583 he went to Naples with the intention of going through the courses of philosophy and medicine; but in 1591, all strangers were compelled to leave the place. Ferdinando, returning to his own country, taught geometry and philosophy until 1594, when the viceroy's edict being revoked, he returned to Naples, pursued a course of medical studies, and received the degree of doctor in medicine and philosophy. He then returned to his native home, where he settled himself and remained to the end of his life, notwithstanding the tempting offers he received from several universities. The Duke of Parma Ranuccio Farnese, in particular, pressed him to take the professorship of medicine in the university of his city; and the same invitation, was given from the University of Padua. In 1605, he was elected syndic-general of his country. He died in Mesagne on 6 December 1638, aged 69.

== Works ==
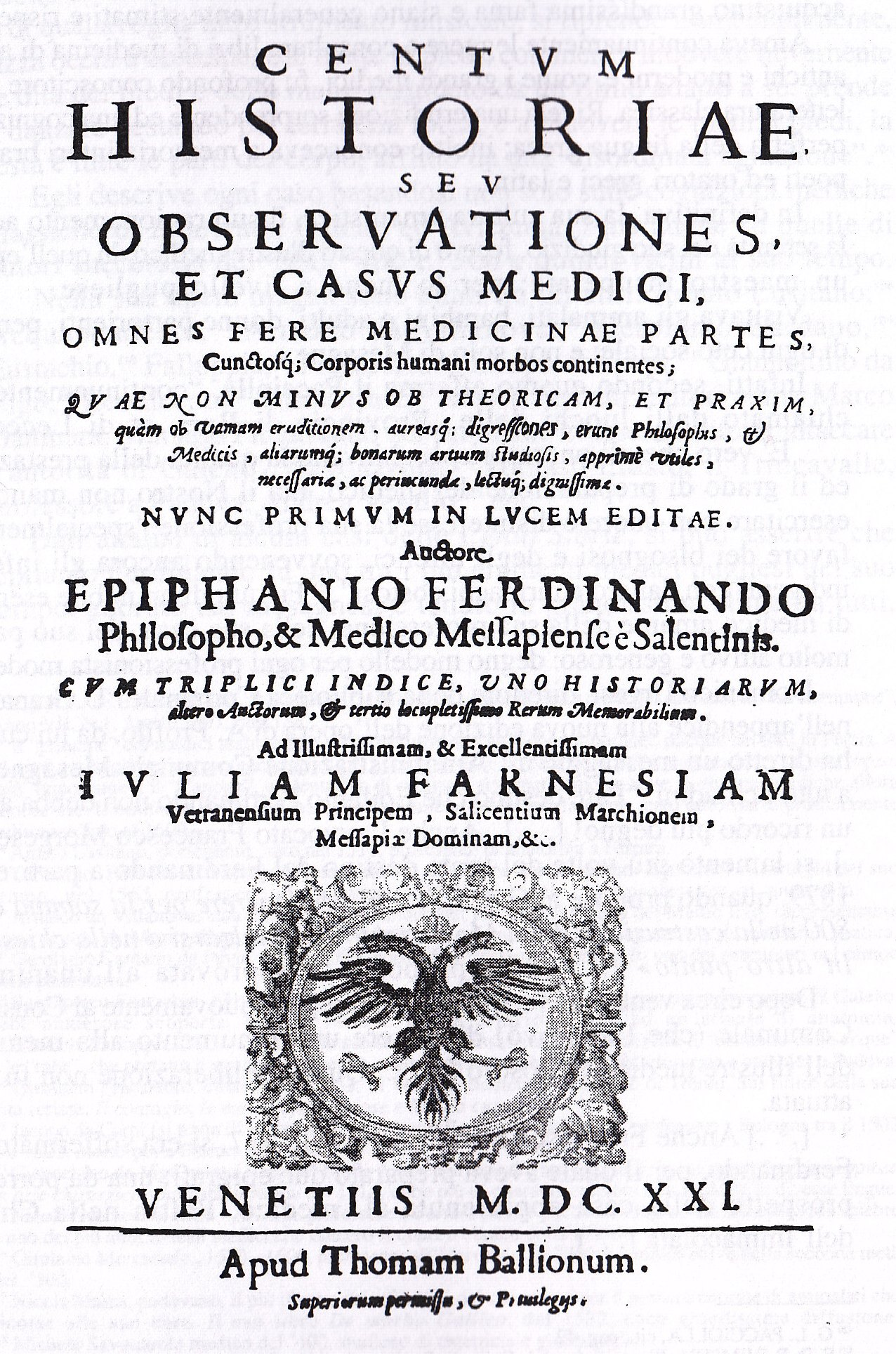
"Centum Historiae, seu Observationes et Casus Medici," Venice, 1621

Epifanio Ferdinando composed a considerable number of treatises, but only the four following are known, as having been printed:

- "Theoremata Medica et Philosophica," Venice, 1611.
- "De vita proroganda, seu juventute conservanda et senectute retardanda," Naples, 1612.
- "Centum Historiae, seu Observationes et Casus Medici," Venice, 1621, a treatise concerning an extensive variety of diseases affecting multiple organs and systems of the human body. Particular emphasis is given to the pathology of psychiatric interest to which six clinical histories are dedicated. It was reprinted several times in Germany and Holland.
- "Aureus de Peste Libellus," Naples, 1631.

== Bibliography ==
- De Angelis, Domenico (1713). "Vita di Epifanio Ferdinando da Mesagne". Le vite de' letterati salentini. Naples: nella stamperia di Bernardo-Michele Raillard. pp. 211–230.
- Chalmers, Alexander (1814). "Epiphanius Ferdinandi". General Biographical Dictionary. Vol. 14. Naples: J. Nichols. pp. 204–205.
- Mario Marti; Domenico Urgesi, eds. (1999). Epifanio Ferdinando, medico e storico del Seicento. Atti del convegno di studi (Mesagne, 28-29 maggio 1999). Nardò: Besa Editrice.
- Gentilcore, David (2003). ""For the Protection of Those Who Have Both Shop and Home in this City": Relations Between Italian Charlatans and Apothecaries". Pharmacy in History. 45 (3). Naples: 108–122. JSTOR 41112169. PMID 15025071.
