= Giovanni Padovani =

Italian mathematician and astronomer

Giovanni Padovani (or Ioannis Paduanni) (b. c. 1512) was an Italian mathematician, astronomer and musician. He lived in Verona and was a student of Pietro Pitati. He published a number of esteemed treatises on various astronomical, mathematical and musical subjects. His most well known publication was a treatise on the sundial called Opus de compositione et usu multiformium horologiorum solarium, pro diversis mundi regionibus, idq(ue) ubique locorum tam in superficie plana horizontali quam murali quoruscumqu(ue) exposita sit, pertractans (Venice, 1570). An expanded and re-written version came out in 1582.

This manual includes instructions for the manufacture and laying out of mural (vertical) and horizontal sundials; contains extensive tables of declinations for various latitudes with both occidental and oriental examples; and provides instructions for the calculation of latitudes. This last section includes a description of a sundial calibrated for the measurement of unequal hours, such as those used in the ecclesiastic calendar, which foresaw twelve hours of light and twelve of dark, which was subject to severe seasonal variations.

== Family and life ==
His father Franciscus (Padovani?) served the Olivetan order in Verona as an organist. Giovanni's uncle, Blasius (Padovani?), lived 86 years and was also an organist at "the main church" of Verona and published two volumes on music; on Gregorian chant and on organ playing "which he wished to appear under the name of Joannes Matthæi."

== Musical theoretical writings ==
Giovanni Padovani dedicated this work to Bishop of Verona Agostino Valier and presents his Institutiones as a brief but complete method by which "anyone can learn to compose songs in the briefest amount of time within the confines of his own home without a teacher." It contains 8 rules of counterpoint with further brief writings on modes, canons, and composing for 2, 3, 4 and 5 voices. The book has a short amount of text, and a very practical orientation, giving many examples which are to be studied and imitated, to be used as one own and transposed to whichever mode one pleases.

The musical examples, which form by far the biggest part of his book, start with florid counterpoint above and below a plainchant, showing basic formulas that one can do according to the movement of the chant. After this he gives examples of cadences, interspersed with stretto fuga or canons, mostly after a semi breve, which he calls formulas, first for two voices, and then for three, four and five voices in the later parts. Of particular note is the final chapter titled Terminandarum Cantionum, which is a collection of supplementi; musical appendixes added after the final structural cadence, mostly with one or more voices holding the finalis tone, not unrelated to pedal point.

== List of works ==
- Institutiones ad diuersas ex plurium vocum harmonia cantilenas, siue modulationes ex uarijs instrumentis fingendas, formulas pene omnes ac regulas, mira et perquam lucida breuitate complectens, 1578
- De compositione et usu multiformium horologiorum solarium (etc.) opus nunc denuo ab ipso illustratum et auctum. Adjectae sunt praeterea peculiares methodi ad dignoscenda stellarum loca (etc.), 1582
- De Singularum Humani Corporis Partium Significationibus, 1589

== Sources ==
- Papyrus Rare Books
- Roger Gaskell Rare Books
- Krown & Spellman Booksellers info
- Kultuurpool.at
