= Ruth D. Lechuga =

Mexican anthropologist

- Born: Ruth Deutsch; 6 February 1920; Vienna, Austria
- Died: 19 September 2004 (aged 84); Mexico City, Mexico
- Other names: Ruth Deutsch de Lechuga, Ruth Deutsch Lechuga
- Occupations: physician, anthropologist
- Years active: 1946-2004
- Known for: Photographs and artifacts on Mexico's indigenous populations

Ruth D. Lechuga (née. Deutsch) (1920–2004) was an Austrian-born, naturalized Mexican citizen who became a physician and a collector of Mexican folk art. Her interest led her to produce anthropological studies on the cultures of the different states of Mexico. She gave up her medical lab work to work in anthropology, curating several museum collections. Lechuga published research on indigenous Mexican culture and craftwork. Her ethnographic photographs earned her notice as one of the major professionals in the field. Her private collection of 20,000 ethnographic photographs and over 10,000 artifacts were donated upon her death to the magazine Artes de México and the Franz Mayer Museum. Several posthumous showings of the collection have taken place and in 2016, a research center bearing her name was opened in the former basement of the Franz Mayer Museum.

== Early life ==
Ruth Deutsch was born on 6 February 1920 in Vienna, Austria to Angela (née Reis) and Arnold Deutsch. Her father was a merchant and she grew up in a household with a younger brother, her parents and a grandmother. Deutsch's father was born in Vienna and though his politics were left-leaning, he was not a communist. He had an appreciation of the fine arts, which he passed on to his daughter. Her mother and maternal grandmother were from Mislitz, Czechoslovakia and celebrated the Jewish holidays. Though the Anschluss annexed Austria to Germany and most Jewish people went into hiding, Deutsch continued her studies at the Realgymnasium, a type of school which focuses on natural sciences, mathematics and languages, earning her matura in 1938. Though the family was not particularly religious, her father got a warning that Kristallnacht was coming and they went into hiding. Because her mother's brother lived in Mexico, they made plans to emigrate, but the visa process was slow. In December 1938, the family tried to sneak across the border to Holland, but were captured and returned to Vienna. They sent their furniture ahead of them to Mexico and when the transit visas finally came through, the family went to Vlissingen (known as Flushing at the time). Leaving the grandmother behind for the time being, the family boarded the S. S. Gerolstein in Flushing, Holland and arrived at the port of New York on 21 January 1939.

After spending a night at Ellis Island the family boarded a train and made their way to Mexico City, where they were met by relatives. None of the family spoke English. Though her father took lessons, Deutsch did not, as she learned it from friends in school. Her mother continued to speak German and learned only enough Spanish to deal with necessities. Arnold found work with a large mercantile firm and Angela worked as a cashier in a business owned by an Austrian. The family was able to help Angela's mother emigrate in 1941. In 1940, Deutsch entered medical school at the National Autonomous University of Mexico (UNAM) and studied for the next six years, graduating in 1946. On weekends, she and her father would take trips throughout Mexico exploring archaeological sites. One particularly memorable trip in 1947 to Bonampak in Chiapas led her to study the Lacandon people and sparked her interest in photography. A mural by José Clemente Orozco also made her recognize the differences between Mexico and Europe. Soon Deutsch began collecting small things. First a ceramic duck from Ocotlán, which was followed by two blouses she purchased in Cuetzalan, but after studying the embroidery, she recognized they were made in Zacapoaxtla.

== Career ==
Upon completion of her studies, Deutsch went to work in the Pils Laboratory of the American Hospital (now Centro Médico ABC (The American British Cowdray Medical Center)), where she worked for several years. In 1951, Deutsch married Carlos Lechuga, a radiologist, who she had met during her schooling. In the beginning, their relationship was happy, as Carlos shared her enthusiasm for exploring Mexican culture and would accompany Lechuga on her weekend explorations with her father. She acquired Mexican citizenship in 1954, never intending to return to live in Austria. In 1956, she founded with several others a photography group known as "La Ventana" (the Window) and they began participating in group exhibitions. She also held several individual exhibits, including one in 1964 at the National School of Visual Arts (Spanish: Escuela Nacional de Artes Plásticas. Soon she joined the Society of Photographic Authors (Spanish: Sociedad de Autores de Obra Fotográfica (SAOF)) and her photographic works began being seen widely through many publications. She would become one of the "major ethnographic photographers of Mexico". Her marriage became strained and after some years, the couple separated.

Between 1965 and 1979 Deutsch led her own serological laboratory, but she began to become more involved with anthropological pursuits. When the National Fund for the Development of Arts and Crafts (Spanish: Fondo Nacional para el Fomento de las Artesanías (FONART)) was created in 1974, Lechuga began working there as a buyer and consultant. She would open the laboratory in the morning and after lunch report to FONART. Combined with all the traveling to research and buy artifacts, she decided to leave the laboratory. By 1977, she had begun working at the National Museum of Popular Arts and Industries (Spanish: Museo Nacional de Artes e Industrias Populares) as curator, where she remained for seventeen years. She and the director, María Teresa Pomar negotiated items for purchase, prepared exhibits, and tried to document and encourage carrying on traditional craft work. They also traveled to Europe several times with collections. In the 1980s, she flew back to Vienna to represent Mexico at the two-week congress of the World Crafts Council.

Lechuga published both articles and books on Mexican folk art. Some of her most noted works include La indumentaria en el México indígena (The Clothing of Indigenous Mexico, 1982), Las Técnicas textiles en el México indígena (Textile Techniques in Indigenous Mexico, 1982), Traje indígena de México (Mexican Indigenous Costumes, 1986) and Máscaras tradicionales de México (Traditional Masks of Mexico, 1991), among others. An unpublished manuscript she had been compiling on the death practices of Mexico was found in her apartment after her death. In 1995, Lechuga turned three apartments, which her family had moved to in 1956, in the Condesa Building in Colonia Condesa into a museum. Because she lived in the home, the museum was open to the public, but by appointment only. In 1998, the magazine Artes de México dedicated their issue 42 to Lechuga in recognition of her scholarly work on the indigenous people of Mexico. Beginning in 2000, Lechuga worked with Gabriela Olmos to classify and document the artifacts in her private collection.

== Death and legacy ==
Lechuga died on 19 September 2004 in Mexico City. A few days before her death, Lechuga donated her collection of 20,000 negatives, which began in 1947 and continued for over fifty years, to Artes de México. The images depict indigenous people, customs, ceremonies and dances, as well as folk art from the various states in Mexico. In addition, she donated around 10,000 artifacts to the Franz Mayer Museum, which included her collection of basketry, ceramics, masks, paintings and textiles created by native people. She also bequeathed the apartments she had lived in and which held the artifacts to the museum. An exhibit called "The Pink Room" which recreated the pink bedroom surrounded by skeletal artifacts occupied by Lechuga was opened on the tenth anniversary of her death at the Franz Mayer Museum. The replication depicted Lechuga's internalization of Mexican death traditions and included a closet full of artifacts of her family's flight from Nazism. In 2016, twelve years after her death, the Ruth D. Lechuga Center for Popular Art Studies (Spanish: Centro de Estudios de Arte Popular Ruth D. Lechuga (CEAP-RDL)) opened in what used to be the basement of the Franz Mayer Museum. After cataloguing the materials Lechuga had donated, the center opened as a space where researchers can study the 14,000 handicrafts, 5,000 books and magazines and over 1,000 personal items in her archive. Anthropologists Marta Turok and Margarita de Orellana are the co-executors of the collection.
