= Miguel Ángel Albizures =

Guatemalan activist

Miguel Ángel Albizures (born 1945) is a Guatemalan human rights activist and newspaper columnist. He is the spokesperson for the Center for Human Rights Legal Action (CALDH) in Guatemala City. Albizures said that he had been pressured and threatened for publishing articles about historical memory and justice.

Albizures has held various leadership positions in Guatemalan human rights and labor organizations, including Director of Guatemala's Democratic Front Against Repression (FDCR), Director of the National Committee for Trade Union Unity (CNUS), and Secretary General of the National Worker's Central (CNT). he also served as the President of the Association of Relatives of the Detained and Disappeared of Guatemala (FAMDEGUA).
