= Pietro Pitati =

Italian 16th century astronomer and mathematician

- Born: 16th century Verona, Republic of Venice
- Died: c. 1550
- Scientific career
- Fields: Mathematics, astronomy

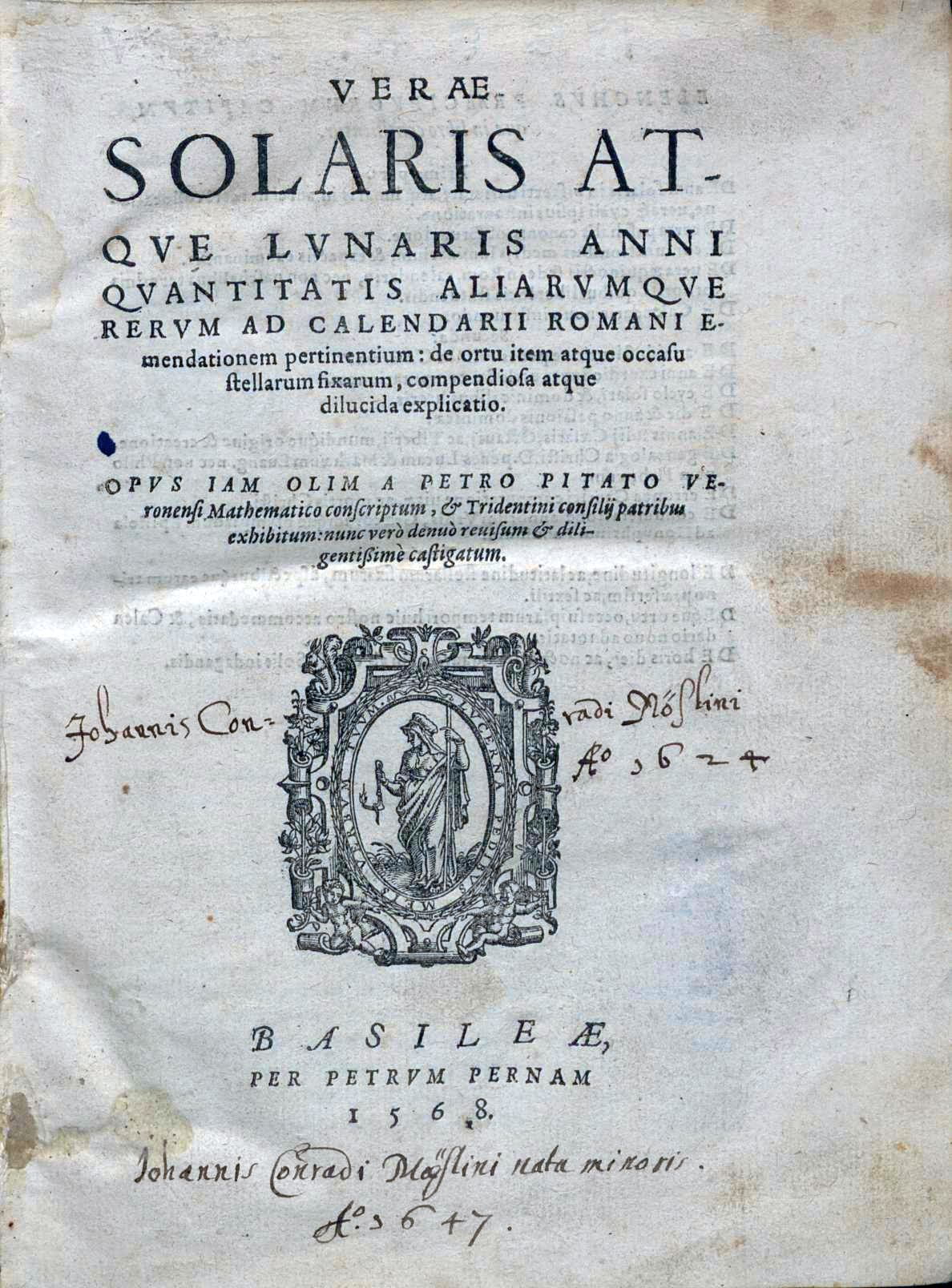
Verae solaris atque lunaris anni quantitatis aliarumque rerum ad calendarii romani emendationem pertinentium, 1568

Pietro Pitati (in Latin, Petrus Pitatus) (?-fl. ca. 1550) was an Italian astronomer and mathematician. Bernardino Baldi, in his Cronica de matematici (1707) calls Pitati a noble Veronese who was trained in mathematics by a Benedictine friar named Innocentio da Novara.

It is known that he was the author of several astronomical works and almanacs. His Paschales atque nouiluniorum mensurni canones. De varia paschalis solemnitatis obseruatione...De Hebraica anni quantitate...Calendarium nouum cum noua aurei numeri positione, ortu quoque, & occasu stellarum fixarum (Venice, March 1537) is one of many sixteenth century attempts to reform the calendar, and establish, among other things, the correct day of Easter. This was his first work.

Pitati also wrote another book bearing on the length of the solar and lunar year, the fixed stars, and calendar reform, entitled: Compendium . . . super annua solaris atque lunaris anni quantitate Paschalis item solennitatis juxta veteres ecclesiae canones recognitione Romanique calendarii instauratione deque vero Passionis Dominicae die ortu quoque et occasu stellarum fixarum, in tres divisum Tractatus. Pitati's proposal for calendar reform "pleaded for the rule whereby three out of four centennial years be ordinary (non leap-years). This is [now] the Gregorian rule."

Pitati compiled ephemerides, to which he added supplements over the years, such as Almanach nouum...Superadditis annis quinque supra ... Ephemeridas 1551. ad futurum Christi annum 1556. Isagogica in coelestem Astronomicam disciplinam ... Tractatus. tres perbreues de Electionibus, Reuolutionibus annorum, & mutatione aeris. Item horariae tabulae per altitudinem solis in die, ac stellarum in nocte ad medium sexti climatis.(Venice, 1542).

The lunar crater Pitatus is named after him. The mathematician and astronomer Giovanni Padovani was a student of Pitati.

== Works ==
- Paschales atque noviluniorum mensurni canones (in Latin). Venezia: Lucantonio Giunta (1.). 1537.
- Compendium super annua solaris, atque lunaris anni quantitate, Paschalis item solennitatis iuxta veteres Ecclesiae canones recognitione, Romanisque calendarii instauratione (in Latin). Venezia: Domenico Nicolini da Sabbio. 1564.
- Verae solaris atque lunaris anni quantitatis aliarumque rerum ad calendarii romani emendationem pertinentium (in Latin). Berna: Peter Perna. 1568.

== Sources ==
- Euromusicology
- Polybiblio
- Cronica de Matematici
