= Giulio Alessandrini =

Italian physician, author, and poet

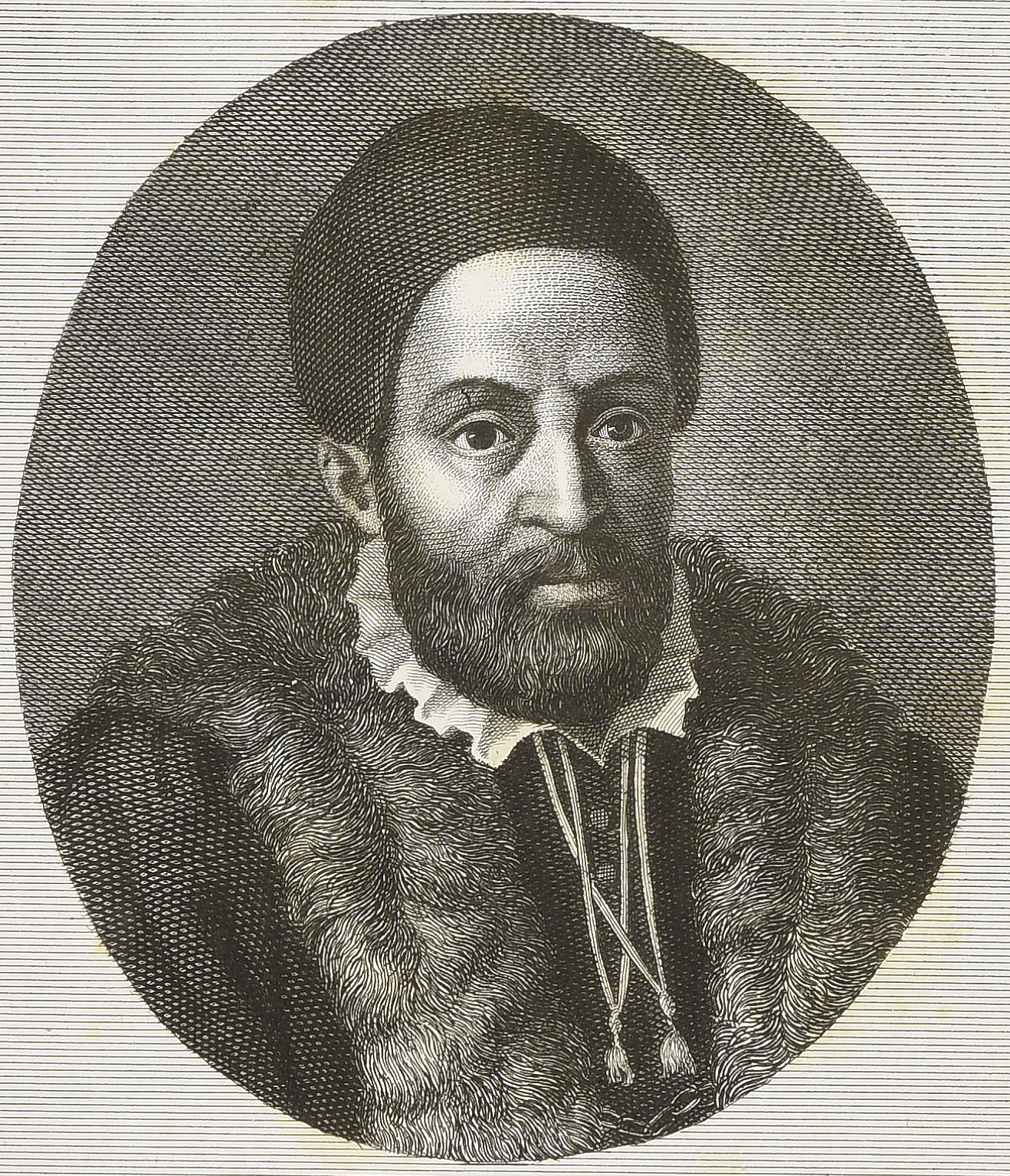
Giulio Alessandrini, chalcography of 1830

Giulio Alessandrini (Latin Julius Alexandrinus or German Julius Alexandrinus von Neustein; 1506 – 25 August 1590) was a physician, writer, and poet.

== Biography ==
Giulio Alessandrini was born in Trento. He studied philosophy at the University of Padua. He was physician to emperors Ferdinand I, Maximilian II, and Rudolph II.

He was a devoted follower of Galen and translated many of Galen's works into Latin, adding his own commentary. He died in Civezzano.

== Works ==
- De medicina et medico dialogus. Zurich, 1557.
- In Galeni præcipua scripta, annotationes quæ commentariorum loco esse possunt. Accessit Trita illa de theriaca quaestio. Basel, 1581.
- Pædotrophia carmine (1559).
- Paedotrophia sive de puerorum educatione. Liber ab auctore recognitus. Ejusdem carmina alia. Trent, 1586.
- Salubrium, sive de sanitate tuenda, libri triginta tres. Cologne, 1575 — A treatise on hygiene compiled from ancient authors.
