= Afsarwala tomb =

Tomb and mosque in Delhi, India

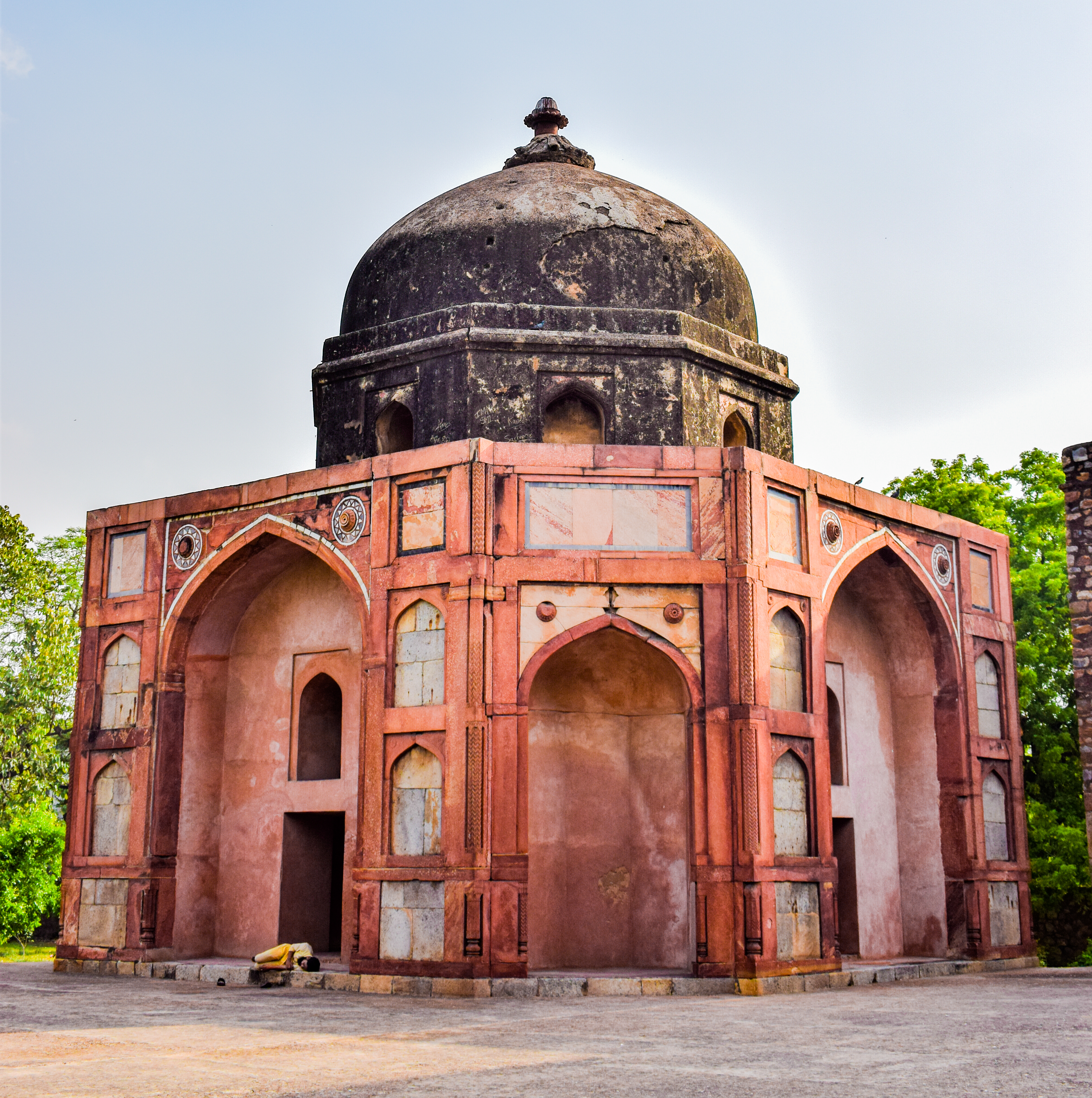
- Afsarwala Tomb

- Location of the tomb and mosque in South Delhi

Religion
- Affiliation: Islam
- Ecclesiastical or organisational status: Mausoleum and mosque
- Status: Active

Location
- Location: Humayun's Tomb, South Delhi, New Delhi
- Country: India
- Coordinates: 28°31′27″N 77°11′09″E

Architecture
- Type: Islamic tomb
- Style: Mughal
- Completed: 974 AH (1566/1567 CE)

Specifications
- Domes: Two (one each on the tomb and mosque)
- Materials: Red sandstone; marble; quartz

UNESCO World Heritage Site
- Type: Cultural
- Criteria: (ii), (iv)
- Designated: 1993 (17th session)
- Part of: Humayun's Tomb
- Region: India

The Afsarwala tomb complex consists of a tomb and mosque, located inside the Humayun's Tomb complex in the south of New Delhi, India. The mausoleum houses the tomb of an unknown person. The tomb, together with other structures, forms the UNESCO World Heritage Site of Humayun's tomb complex. Within the complex, the tomb stands east of the Arab Serai and south-east of the mosque.

== Name and dating ==
According to an explanation by the Archeological Survey of India the name "Afsarwala tomb" could derive from Persian: افسر, romanized: afsar, lit. 'officer', making the building an "officer-wala's tomb", a grave for a military commander. A more recent theory points instead to the Transcaucasian tribal name Afsar or Afshar as a more likely origin, noting that several elite members of this tribe were employed at the early Mughal court, including one namebearer, who helped Humayun during his return and recapture of India in 1555. New findings suggest that Afsarwala, no matter its etymology, might in any case be a misnomer, since the mosque of the complex was apparently built by Gulbadan Begum, under the title “Nawab Begum”, during the reign of Akbar (c. 1577–1581 CE).

One of the graves inside the mausoleum contains the number 974, believed by the Archaeological Survey of India to indicate 974 AH (1566/1567 CE).

== Architecture ==
=== Mosque ===
According to archaeological evidence, the mosque was built between 1560 and 1567. Located adjacent to the Afsarwala tomb, the mosque is built on the same raised platform as the tomb. The façade contains three arches, with red-painted spandrels, each arch enclosing its own alcove. Staircases to the terrace are located at the extreme two sides of the mosque.

Stucco lines the mosque's interior, with ceiling arches containing medallions. The soffit of the nave is painted stucco. The drum which sits underneath the dome of the mosque is octagonal on the outside, but square in shape internally. Red paint is used to decorate the drum.

There is only one dome and chhatri. Ram Nath opines that the plan of the mosque is nothing new and the themes are just replicas of previous mosques.

=== Tomb ===
The Afsarwala tomb is built on the raised platform of the mosque. The mausoleum is built from grey quartz and lined with red sandstone and marble. A single cruciform chamber with a double dome is located inside the mausoleum. Externally, the mausoleum is octagonal in shape. Each side of the octagon contains an arch with a squared doorway, which opens into the inner chamber. Red sandstone is used to decorate the spandrels of the arches. The external dome rises from an octagonal drum and is crowned by a red sandstone lotus finial.

== Gallery ==
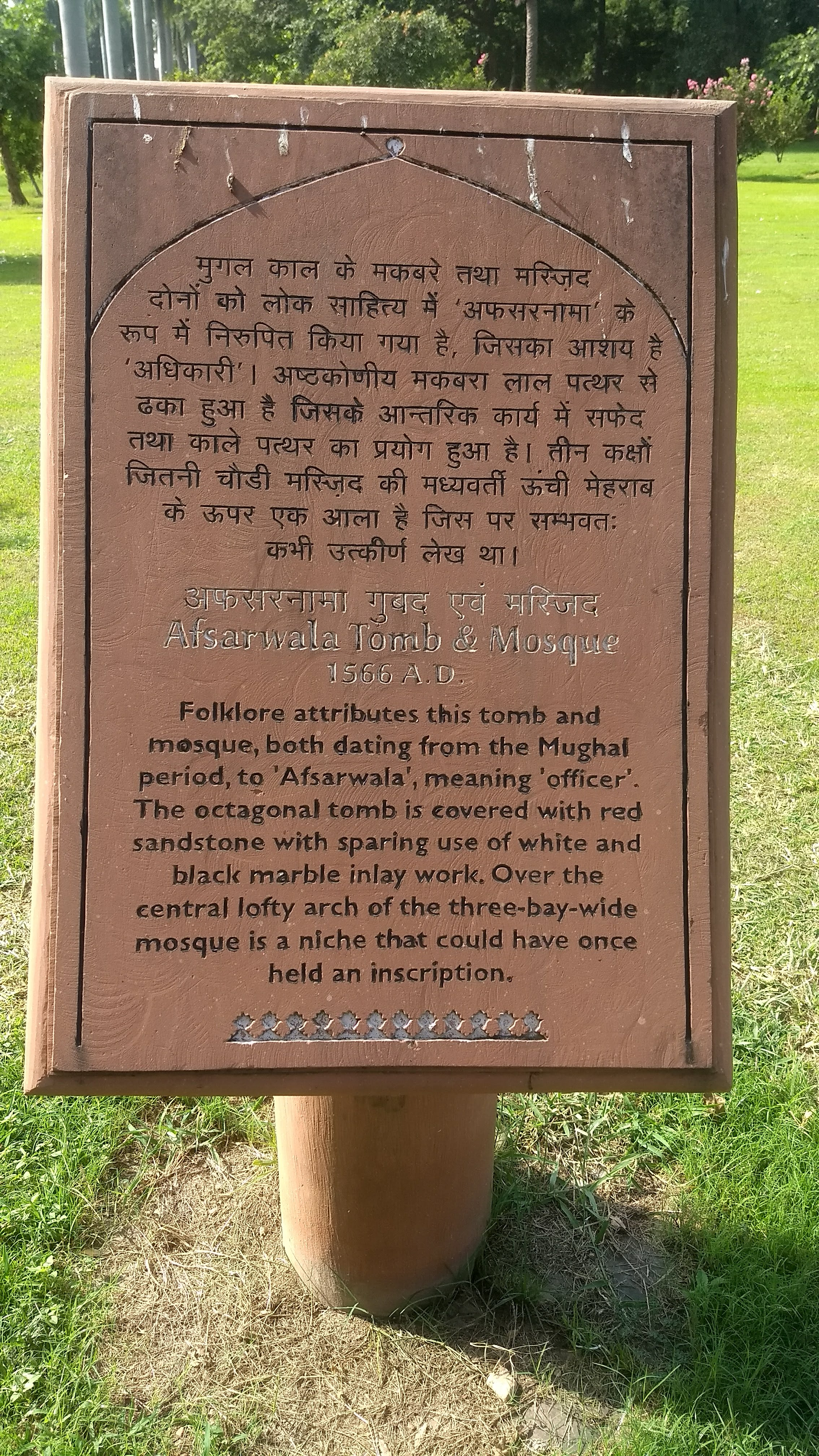
The plaque outside the complex

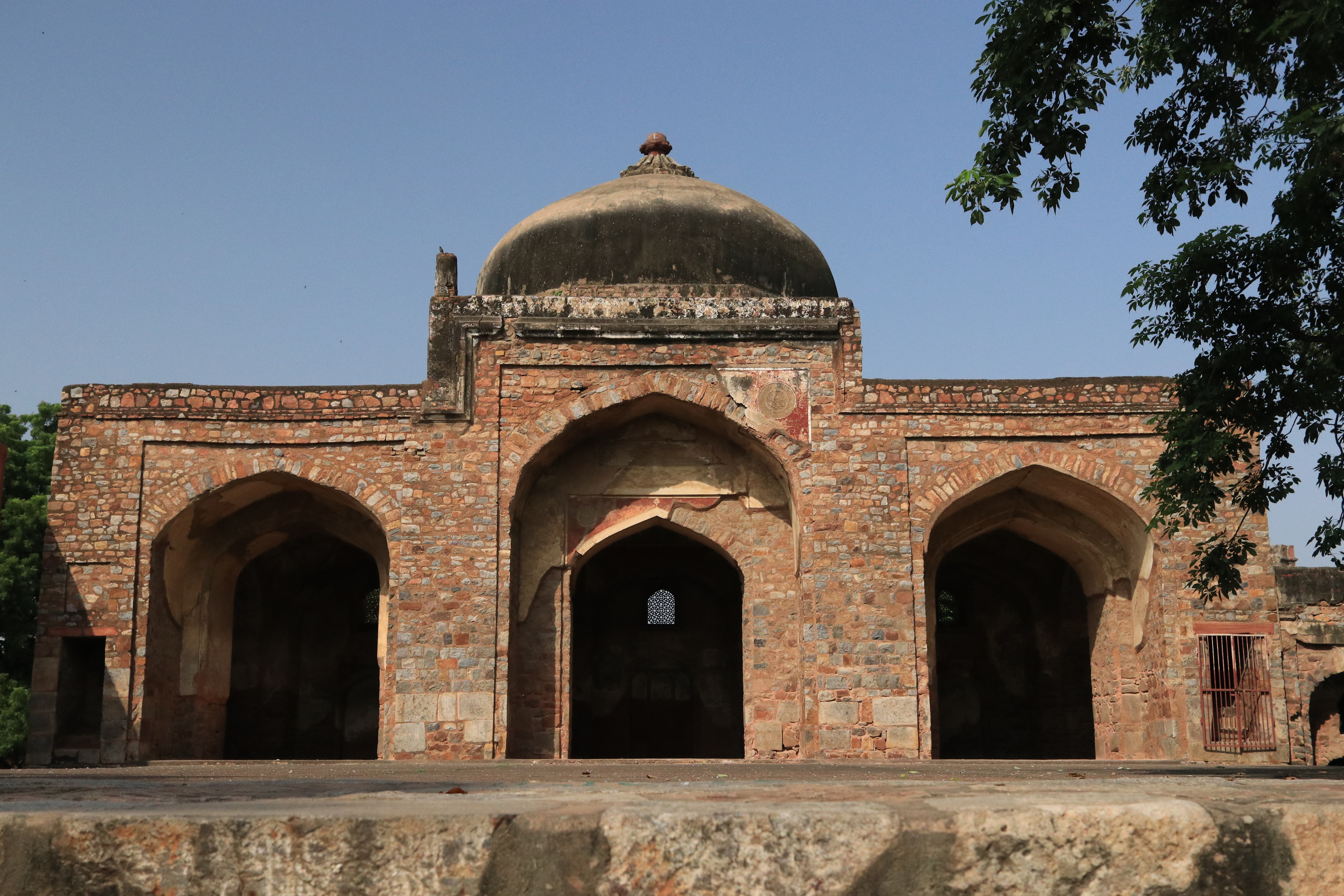
Afsarwala mosque

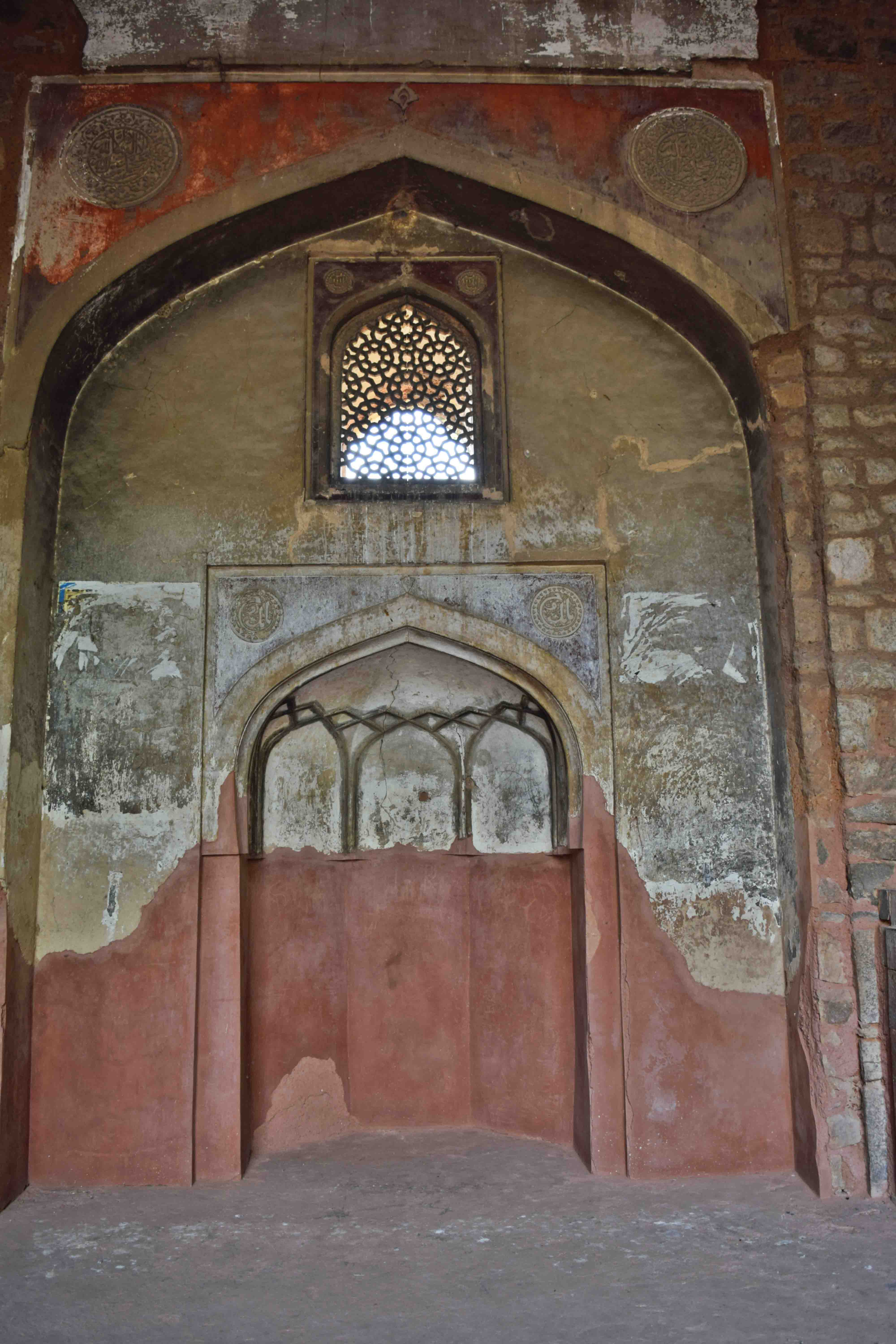
Mihrab of the mosque

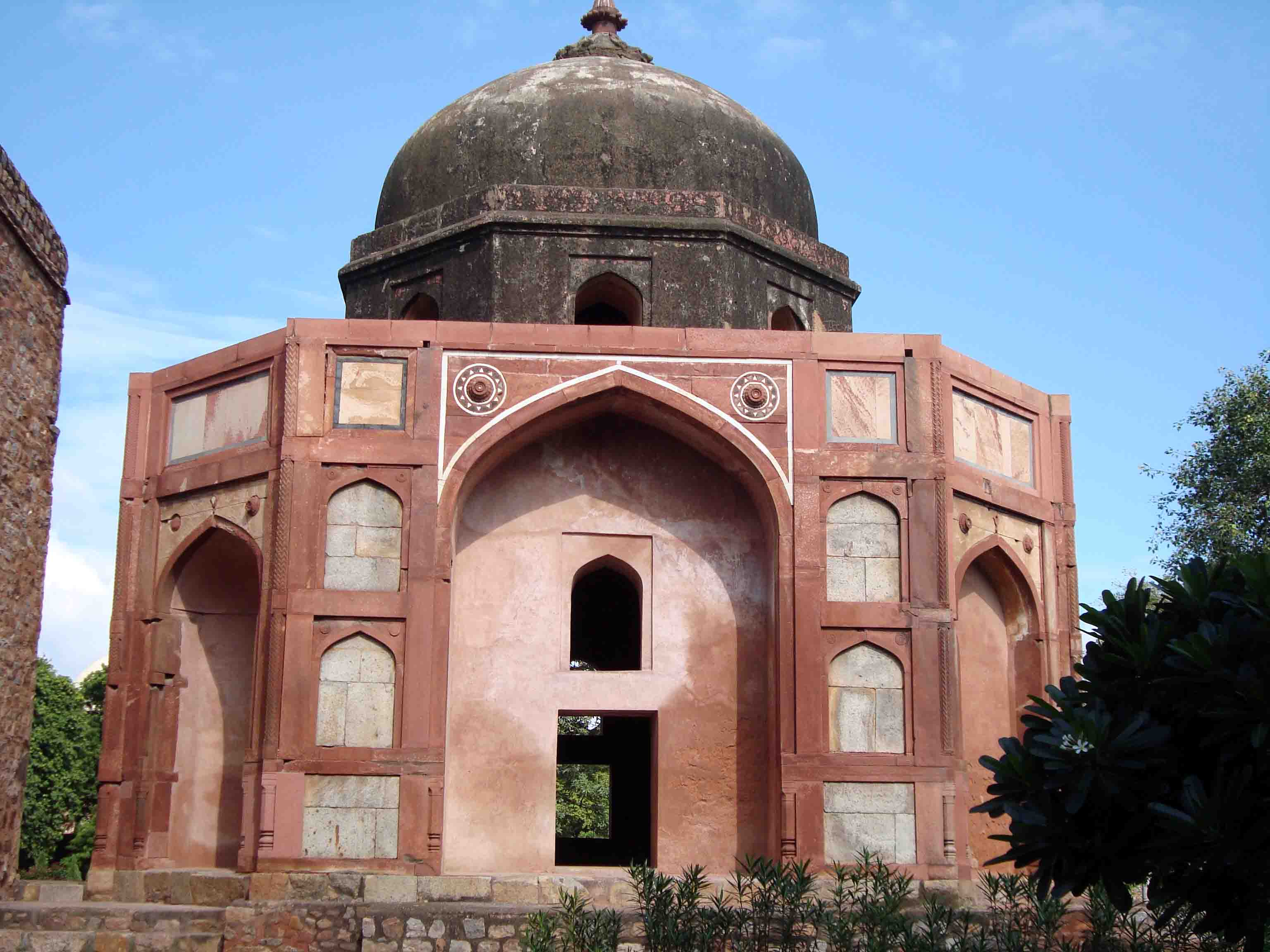
Afsarwala masouleum

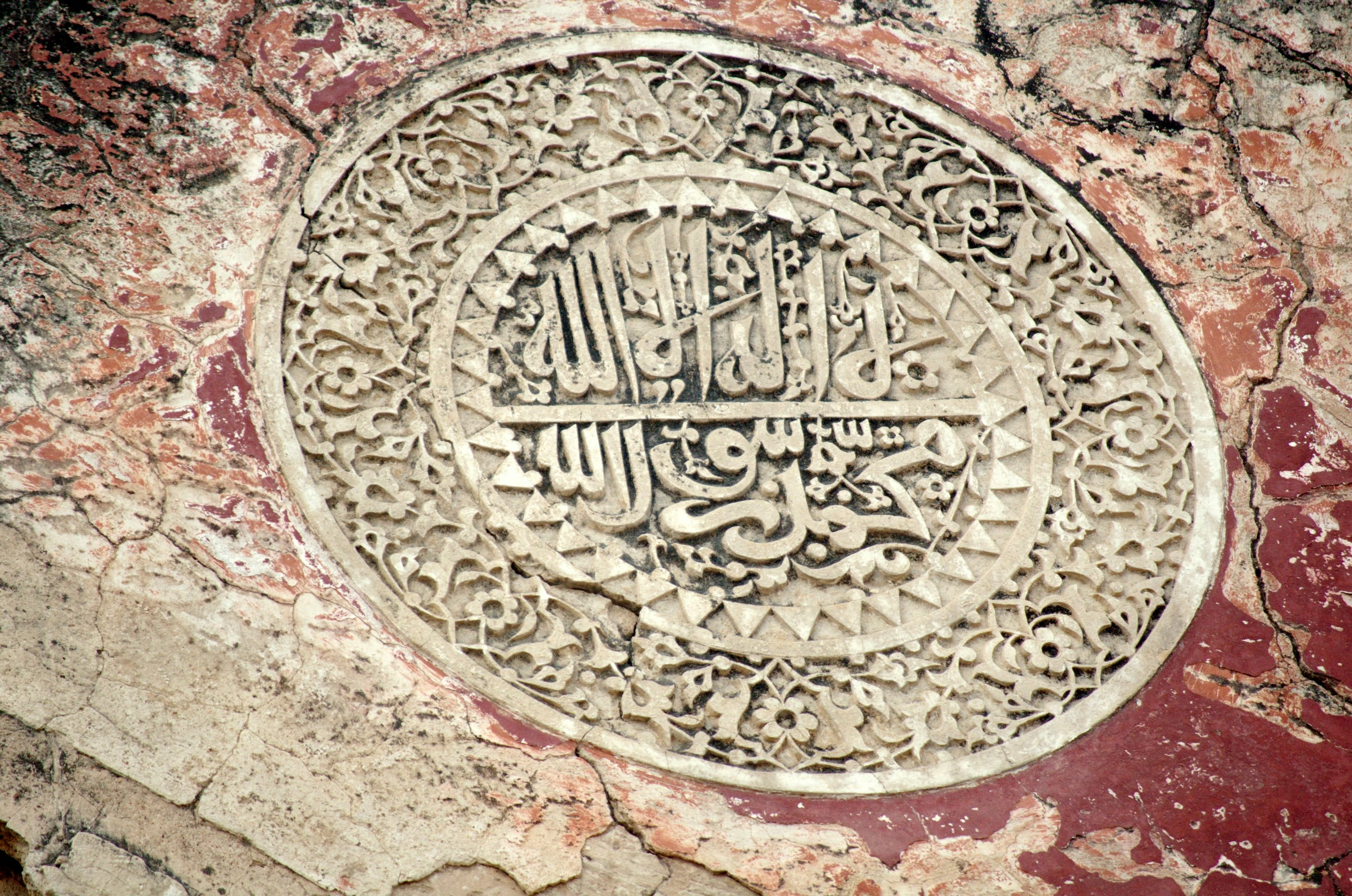
Calligraphic inscription inside the mausoleum

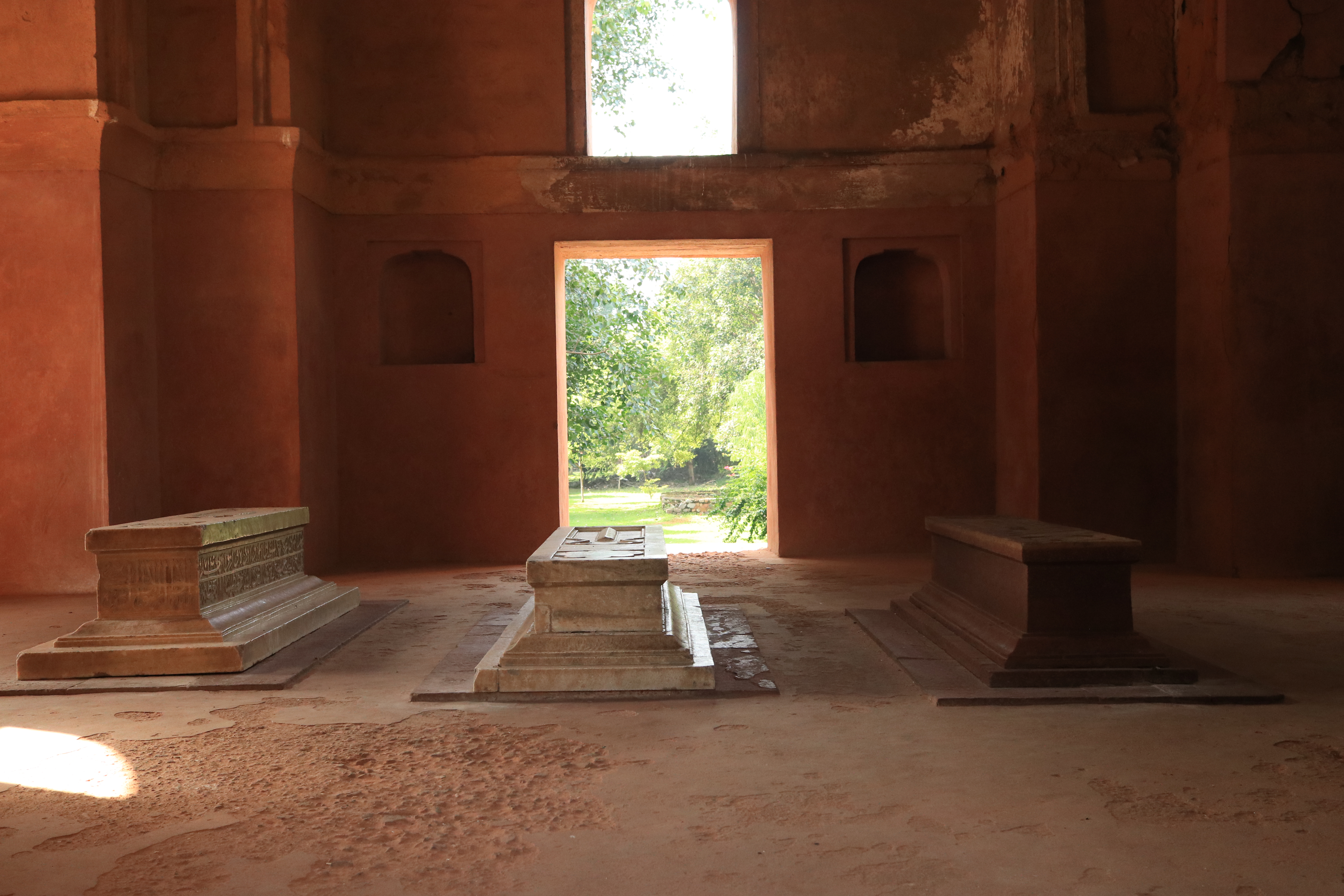
The grave chamber containing the cenotaphs

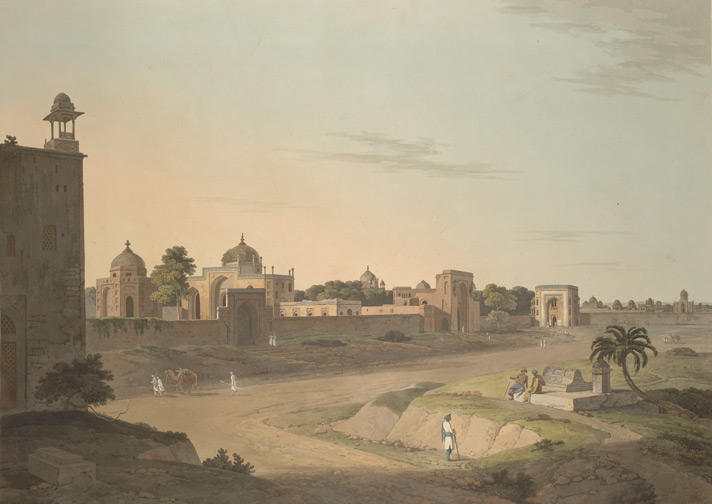
An 1803 painting of the complex

== See also ==
- Islam in India
- List of mosques in India
- List of World Heritage Sites in India
