= Humphrey Baker =

English astrologer and mathematician

Humphrey Baker (fl. 1562–1587), was an English writer on arithmetic and astrology.

== Biography ==
Baker was a Londoner. In 1562 he published The Wellspring of Sciences, an introductory arithmetic textbook which was second in popularity only to Robert Recorde's The Grounde of Artes during the late sixteenth and seventeenth centuries. Both were eventually supplanted by Edward Cocker's Cocker's Arithmetick at the turn of the eighteenth century.

Baker was an enthusiast for his science. In the dedication of his edition of 1574 "to the Governor, Consuls, Asistentes, &c. of the Company of Merchentes Adventurers," he excuses himself for not entering fully into the merits of arithmetic, on the ground that 'where good wine is to sell, there neede no garlande be hāged out.' He nevertheless proceeds to state that it is well known 'that the skil hereof immediately flowed from the wisdome of God into the harte of man, whome he coulde not conceave to remayne in the most secrete misterie of Trinitie in Unitie, were it not by the benifite of most Devine skill in Numbers. . . . Take away Arithmetick, wherein differeth the Shepparde frō the sheepe, or the horse keeper from the Asse? It is the key and entrance into all other artes and learninge, as well approved Pythagoras, who caused this inscription to be written (upon his schoole doore where hee taught Philosophy) in greate letters, "Nemo Arithmeticæ ignanarus hic ingrediatur."' He calls the rule of three 'the golden rule.'

Phillippes added considerably to Baker's book in his edition, giving us, among other things, a chapter 'Of Sports and Pastime done by numbers. To know what number any one thinketh,' &c. In the library of the British Museum there are six different editions of Baker's work, from 1574 to 1655, besides Phillippes's edition of 1670.

Baker also translated from the French and published in London in 1587 a little book in black letter entitled 'The Rules, &c. touching the use and practice of the common almanacs which are named Ephemerides, a brief and short instruction upon the Judicial Astrologie for to prognosticate of things to come by the help of the same Ephemerides, with a treatise added hereunto touching the conjunction of the Planets and of their Prognostications,' &c. Among the prognostications are such as these : 'If the moon be in conjunction with Jupiter, it is good to let blood,' 'If Saturn, Jupiter, Mars, and the moon be found conjoined in the sign of Leo, men shall be grieved with pains of the stomach.'
