= Miguel Ángel Onzari =

Argentine footballer

Personal information
- Full name: Miguel Ángel Onzari
- Date of birth: 23 March 1951 (age 75)
- Place of birth: Buenos Aires, Argentina
- Height: 1.88 m (6 ft 2 in)
- Position: Goalkeeper

Youth career
- 1962–1967: Huracán
- 1967–1968: Boca Juniors

Senior career*
Years	Team	Apps	(Gls)
1968–1971	Vélez Sársfield	(total)	(↓)
1972	Colo-Colo	31	(0)
1973–1974	Vélez Sársfield	20	(0)
1975–1977	Chacarita Juniors	56	(0)
1978	Manta Sport	15	(0)
1979–1982	Emelec	95	(0)
Total		217	(0)
- * Club domestic league appearances and goals

Miguel Ángel Onzari (born March 23, 1951, in Buenos Aires, Argentina) is an Argentine former football goalkeeper who played in clubs of Argentina, Chile and Ecuador.

== Teams ==
- (Argentina) Vélez Sársfield 1968–1971
- (Chile) Colo Colo 1972
- (Argentina) Vélez Sársfield 1973–1974
- (Argentina) Chacarita Juniors 1975–1977
- (Ecuador) Manta 1978
- (Ecuador) Emelec 1979–1982

== Titles ==
- (Chile) Colo Colo 1972 (Chilean League)
