= Michelangelo (disambiguation) =

Michelangelo most often refers to the Tuscan Renaissance sculptor, architect, painter, and poet.

Michelangelo may also refer to:

- Michelangelo (given name)
- Michelangelo (Teenage Mutant Ninja Turtles), originally Michaelangelo
- 3001 Michelangelo, asteroid named after the artist
- SS Michelangelo, an ocean liner named after the artist
- Michelangelo (computer virus)
- "Michelangelo" (song), by Björn Skifs
- "Michelangelo", a song by Emmylou Harris from her album Red Dirt Girl
- The Michelangelo, a hotel in New York
- Michelangelo (crater), an impact basin in the Michelangelo quadrangle of Mercury

== See also ==
- Mike and Angelo, a British TV sitcom
