= Robert Alaine =

British astronomer and writer

Robert Alaine (fl. ca. 1576) held an office under a nobleman in the time of Queen Elizabeth, and is now only known for an elaborate treatise, Alaine's Astronomy, on astronomical instruments, which is preserved in the library of Trinity College, Cambridge. It was given to the library by Sir Edward Stanhope.
