= Cristobal Lechuga =

Cristóbal Lechuga
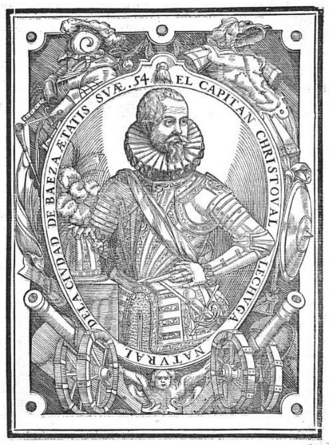
- Born: 1557; Baeza
- Died: 1622 (aged 64–65); Unknown place
- Occupation: Military Engineer
- Known for: Treatise on Artillery and Fortification

Signature
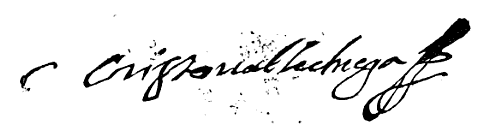

Cristóbal Lechuga Baeza, Spain ca 1557 - 1622) was a soldier and mathematician, known to have published a treaty of artillery and fortification.

== Life ==
Little is known of his life before 1585. As explained by himself, he entered the army when he only was 18 years old. In 1585, he was sergeant in Francisco of Bobadilla's army in to Flanders; in 1590 he was imprisoned for some time for participation in a mutiny.

From 1593, as an artillery officer in the Spanish army, he took part in the wars of Spain against Henry IV of France and against the Flemish rebels. He took part in the sieges of La Chapelle (1594), Doullens, Cambray (1595), Calais (1596) and in the defense of Amiens, occupied by the Spanish army in 1597. In this period he met his main sponsor: Pedro Enríquez of Acevedo, count of Fuentes, who had been appointed governor of Milan in 1600.

From 1600, as inspector of fortificacions of the Duchy of Milan, he carried out numerous secret missions for the Spain; He also took part in the foundation of the Academy of Artillery of Milan, for what Fuentes had obtained the approval of the king, Philip III of Spain From Milan, he recommended that Spain create a similar academy in Madrid.

The death of the count of Fuentes in 1610 left Lechuga without any political support. Yet, in 1613 he was transferred to the Royal Navy based in Cadiz and he was appointed lieutenant general..

In 1614 he took part in the expedition against La Mamora, now Mehdya (Morocco), and was appointed governor once the place was conquered, and commissioned to build strong fortifications there.

In 1620 he was faced with aggression from the Moroccans of the area; their siege was broken by reinforcements from Cadiz in 1621. In September 1622 Diego of Escobedo was appointed governor of La Mamora as his replacement; it is not known if the appointment was due to the death or the resignation of Cristobal Lechuga.

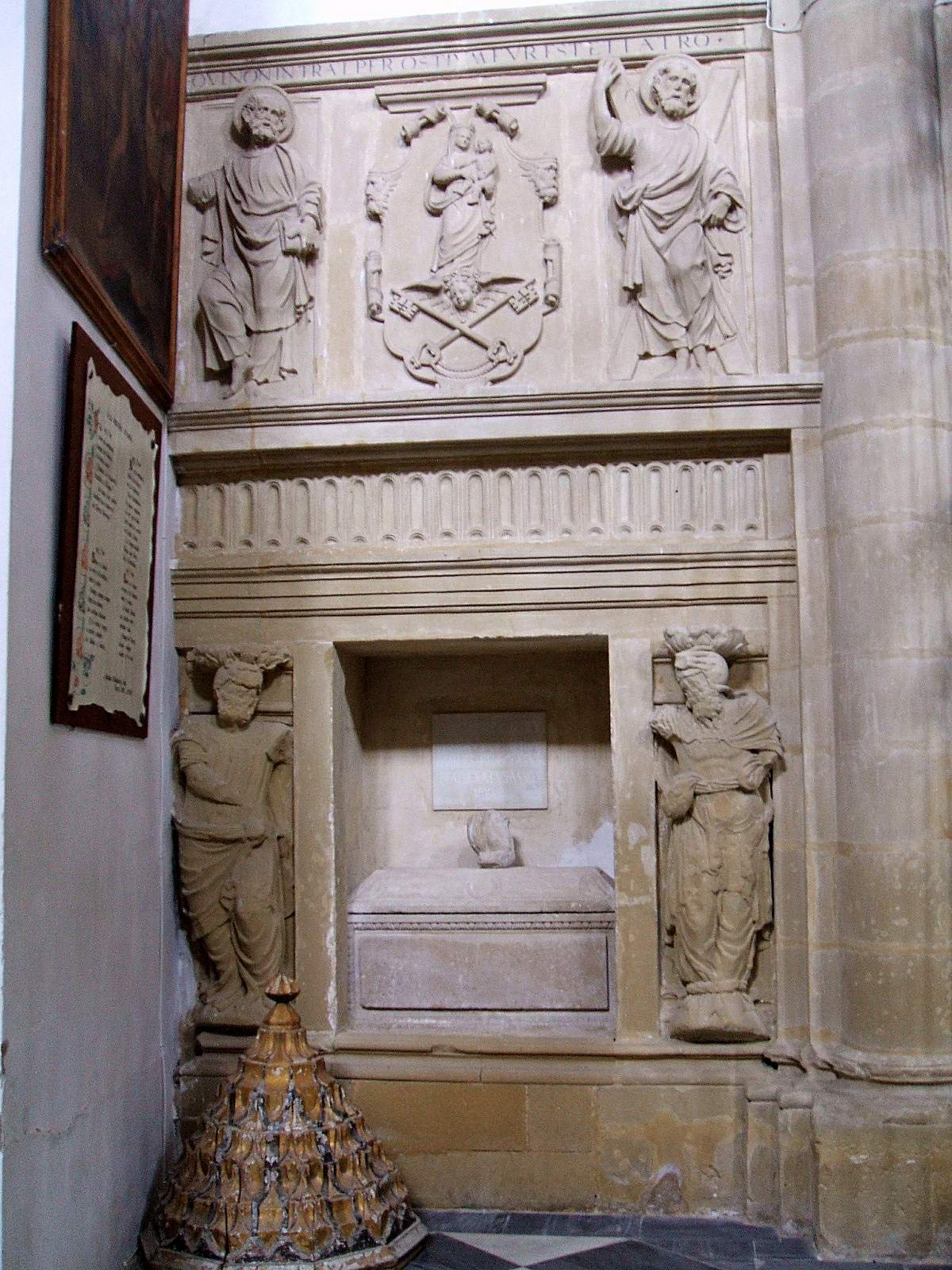
Grave of Cristóbal Lechuga in Baeza Cathedral

However, in the years 1618–1619, perhaps during a leave in his natal village, Baeza, he erected a family chapel in the Romanesque church of Santa Cruz, where he wanted to be buried. This chapel-sepulchre was moved to Baeza's Cathedral, when the church was "desamortitzada" in 1835 and we can see it, still today, in this place.

== Works ==
Lechuga Is known to have written two works of military technics:

- Discurso en el que trata del cargo de Maestro de Campo General (Milan, 1603), probably written while he was in Flandes, but published some years after. The work is written to show that tradition and antiquity can not be the criteria for evaluating the merit of military officers, but rather their professional preparation and technical capacity.
- Discurso en el que trata de la Artilleria con un tratado de Fortificación (Milan, 1611). The book continues his emphasis on the professionalism of the military. He considers that the Artillery is the most important arm of a modern army, he discusses it more deeply, recommending normalization of calibration, building and location of the pieces, etc. The discussion is based on a scientific and technical point of view.

== Bibliography ==
- Giannini, Massimo Carlo. «Pratica delle Armi e istruzione militare: Cristóbal Lechuga ufficiale e scrittore nella Milano di inizio Seicento». In: José María Merry Peyrón, M. Rizzo, G. Mazzocchi (eds.). La espada y la pluma: il mondo militare nella Lombardia spagnola cinquecentesca (in Italian). Mauro Baroni Editore, 2000, p. 483-515. ISBN 9788882091408.
- González de León, Fernando. The Road To Rocroi: Class, Culture and Command in the Spanish Army of Flanders (in English). Leiden: Brill, 2009. ISBN 978-90-04-17082-7.
- González de León, Fernando. "Doctors of the Military Discipline": Technical Expertise and the Paradigm of the Spanish Soldier in the Early Modern Period (in English). Sixteenth Century Journal. Vol 27, No 1, 1996. ISSN 0361-0160, doi:10.2307/2544269.
- Martínez Laínez, Fernando. Una Pica en Flandes: La epopeya del Camino Español (in Spanish). Madrid: EDAF, 2007. ISBN 978-84-414-1947-6.]
- Martínez Laínez, Fernando; Sánchez de Toca, José María. Los Tercios de España: La infantería legendaria (in Spanish). Madrid: EDAF, 2006. ISBN 978-84-414-1847-9.
- de los Ríos, Vicente. "Discurso sobre los ilustres autores e inventores de la Artillería" (in (Spanish)). Memorias de la Real Academia de la Historia [Madrid], vol. IV, 1805, p. 1-65.
