= 1550s in architecture =

== Buildings ==
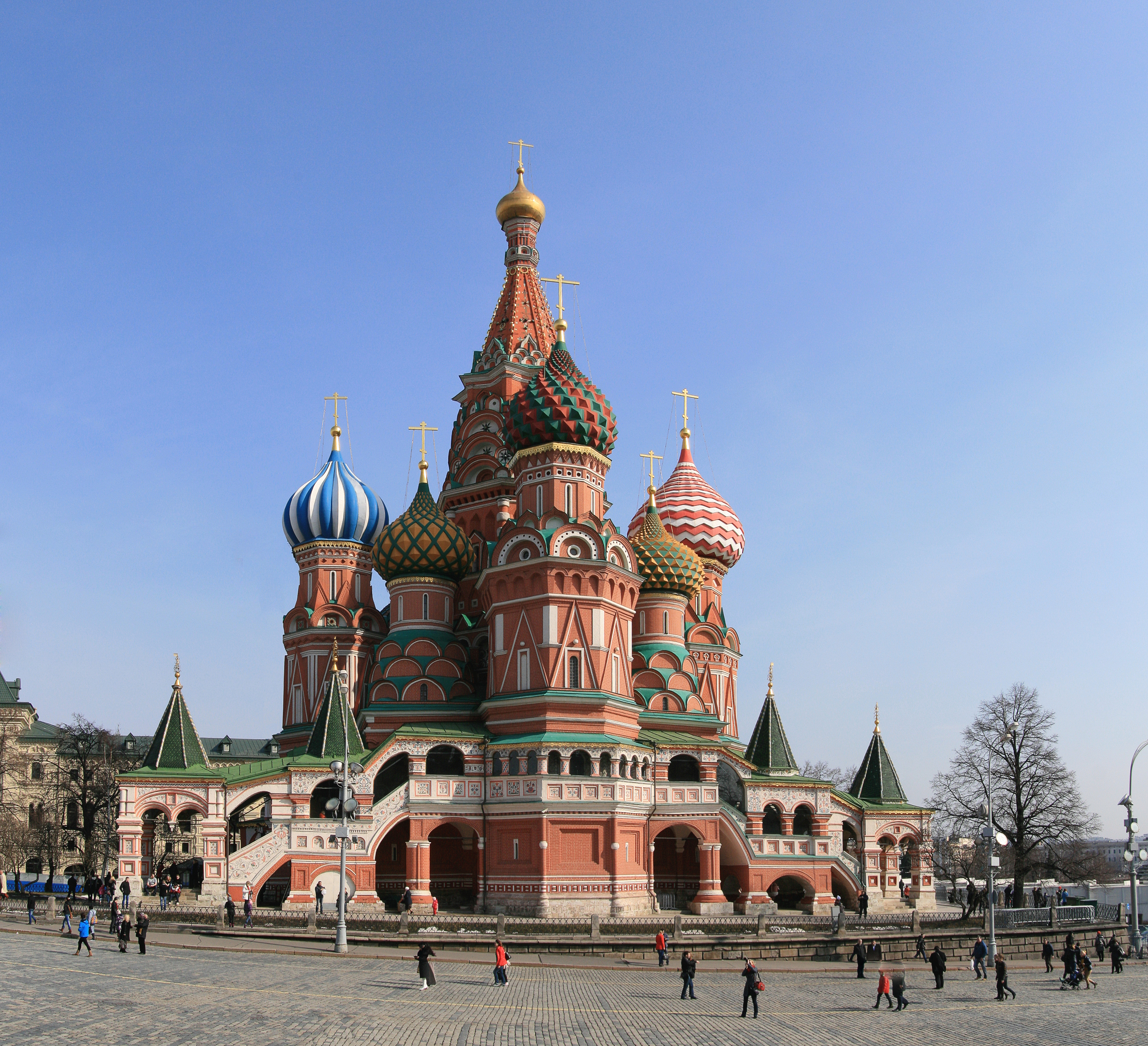
Saint Basil's Cathedral in Moscow, Russia

- 1550–1554 – Church of Sant'Andrea in Via Flaminia, Rome, designed by Giacomo Barozzi da Vignola, constructed, the first church of the Italian Renaissance to have an elliptical dome.
- 1550–1557 – Süleymaniye Mosque in Istanbul, designed by Mimar Sinan, constructed.
- 1552–1554 – Design and construction of Villa Cornaro in the Veneto by Palladio.
- 1552 – Work begins on Fort Saint Elmo on Malta.
- 1554
  - Work begins on Saint Basil's Cathedral in Moscow.
  - Work begins on Sulaymaniyya Takiyya (western building) in Damascus.
- c. 1555 – Design and construction of monastery of Santiago Apóstol and its basilica church in Cuilapan de Guerrero, Oaxaca, Mexico, by Antonio de Barbosa, begins.
- 1558 – Sforza Chapel in Basilica di Santa Maria Maggiore, Rome, designed by Michelangelo.
- 1559
  - Work begins on the Villa Farnese at Caprarola, designed by Vignola.
  - Sulaymaniyya Takiyya (western building) in Damascus is completed.
- 1567- Villa Le Rotonda by Andrea Palladio

== Renaissance Architecture ==
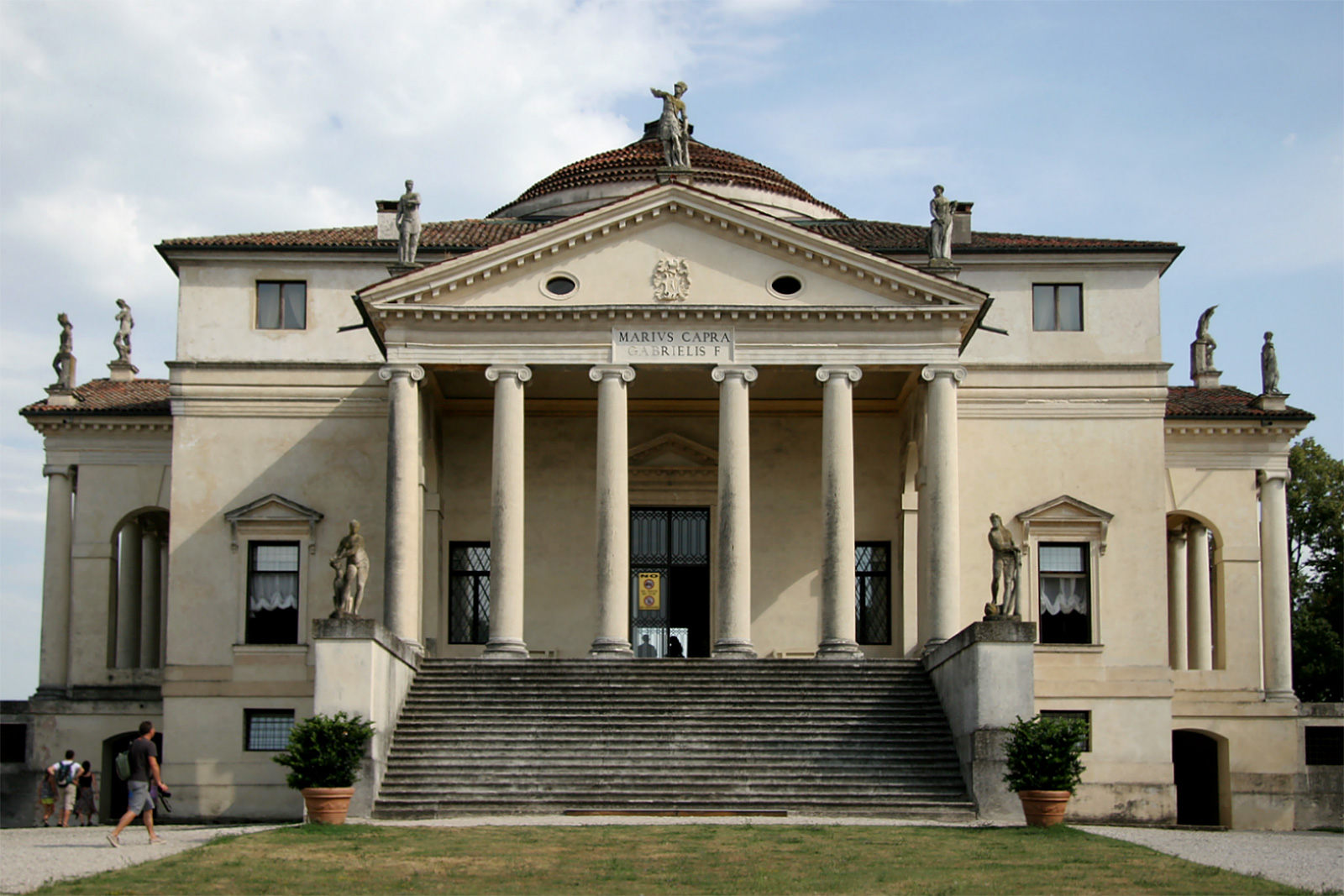
Palladio's Villa Rotonda

The 1550s were filled with buildings from the Renaissance period. One example of this was Andrea Palladio Villa Rotonda. Although the building was complete in the 1590s, the design began in the 1550s. You can see the symmetry, proportion, and use of classical order. The building resides just outside of the city Vicenza in Italy. Palladio later published his pieces, Four Books of Architecture. While Palladio didn't have the sketches when construction began, he drew them up for the intended design of the completed building to include when published. Since his publishing, there has been many recreations of his sketches and even buildings around the world. Giovanni Dominico Giaconi later redid his sketches in watercolor.

== Influences to Architecture ==
One many specifically sticks out, as an influence to High Renaissance and the Mannerism period is Michelangelo. He created pieces of art that inspired architects of his time to expand their horizon out of their comfort zone. This brought out a whole new decorative side to the classical architecture as seen before.

Sebastiano Serlio wrote his Seven Books on Architecture that would impact the entire architecture community from then on. The six books consisted of advice to future architects of and surveyed buildings. The seventh and eighth volumes were added at later dates following the rage of the original six.

== Births ==
- 1550: April 18 – Alessandro Pieroni, Italian mannerist painter and architect (died 1607)
- c.1550 – Vittorio Cassar, Maltese architect (died c.1607)
- 1556 – Carlo Maderno, Ticinese-born baroque architect (died 1629)

== Deaths ==
- 1554 – Sebastiano Serlio, Wrote the Seven Books on Architecture (born 1475)
- 1564 - Michelangelo, Popular painter at the time, influenced many architects to expand their creativity (born 1475)
