= 1560s in architecture =

| List of years in architecture | (table) |
- … 1550; 1551; 1552; 1553; 1554; 1555; 1556; 1557; 1558; 1559; 1560; 1561; 1562; 1563; 1564; 1565; 1566; 1567; 1568; 1569; 1570 …
- Buildings and structures: Art; Archaeology; Architecture; Literature; Music; Philosophy; Science; +...

== Buildings and structures ==
=== Buildings ===
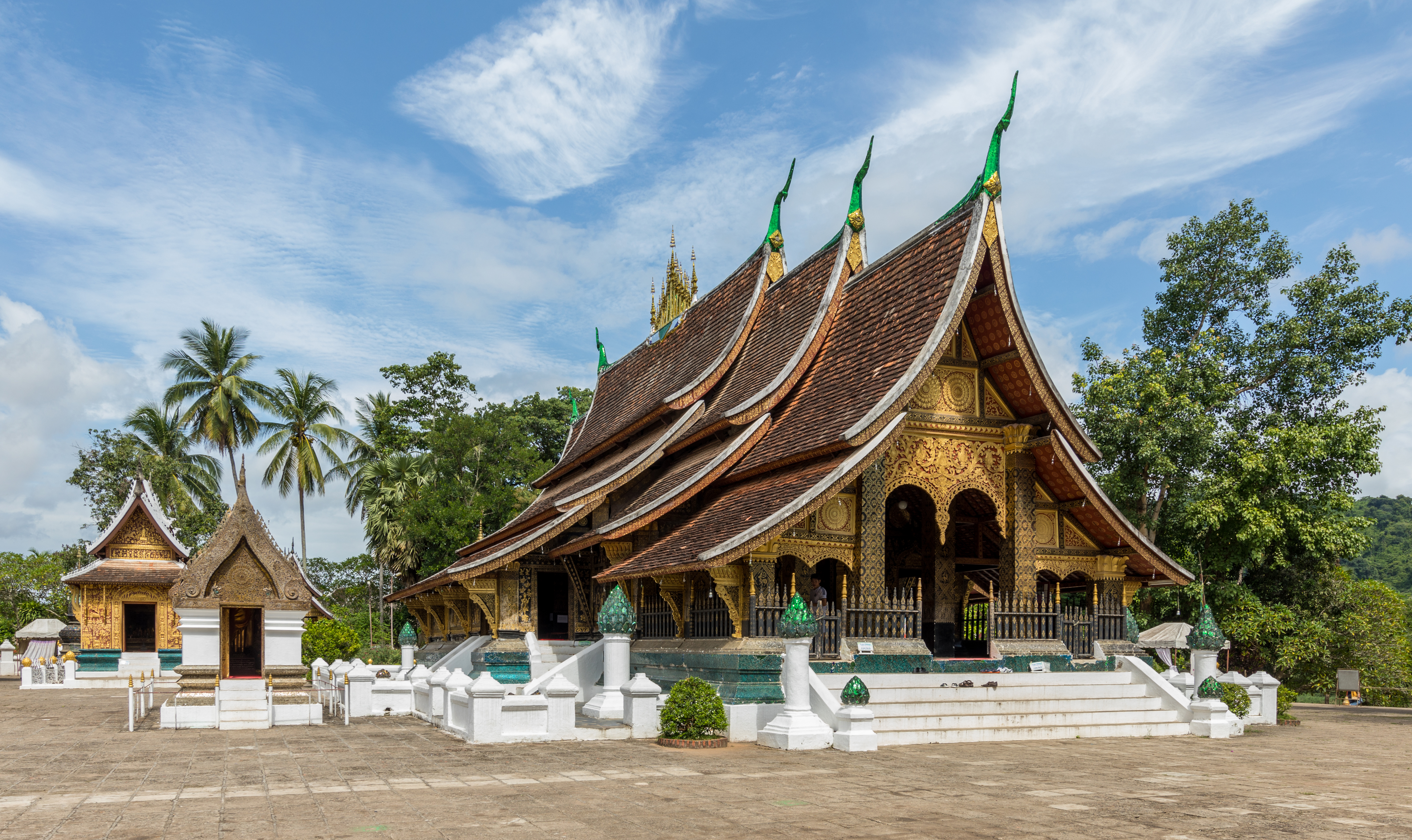
Wat Xieng Thong Buddhist temple at Luang Prabang, Laos

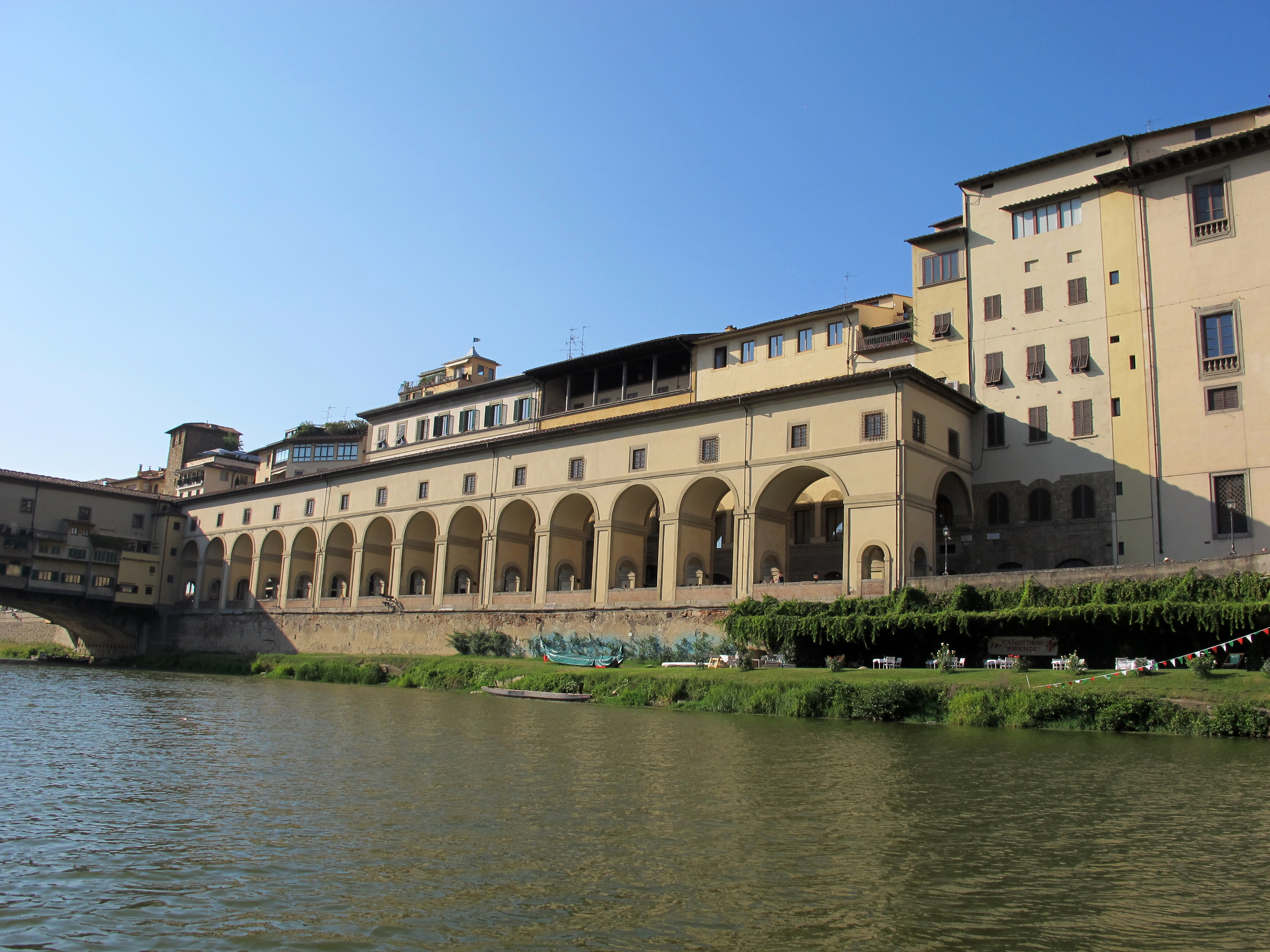
Vasari Corridor in Florence, Italy

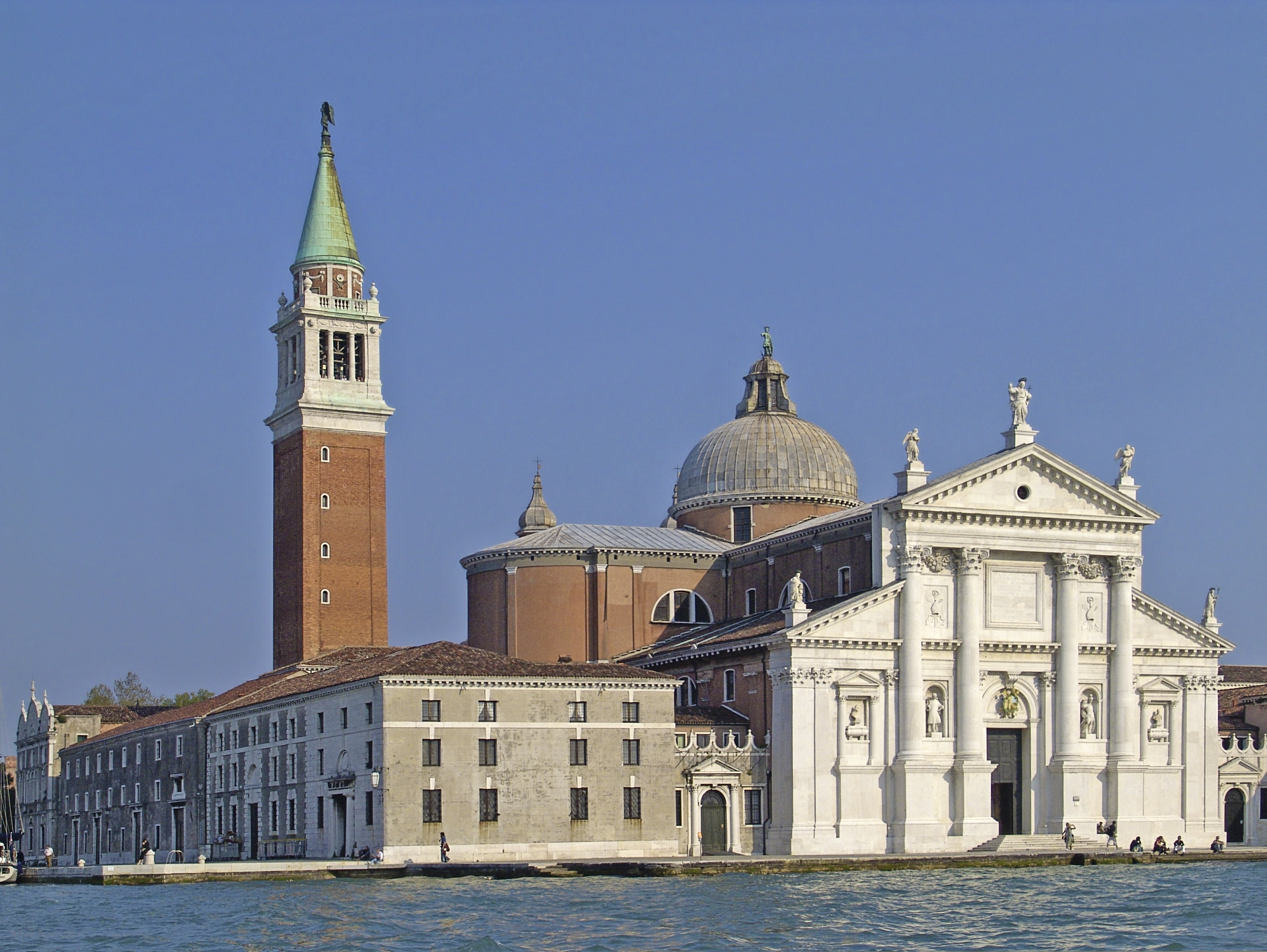
The Church of San Giorgio Maggiore in Venice, Italy

- 1560
  - Palladian villas of the Veneto: Villa Foscari is completed and Villa Barbaro is probably begun.
  - Wat Xieng Thong Buddhist temple at Luang Prabang in the kingdom of Lan Xang (modern-day Laos) is completed.
  - Construction of the Uffizi in Florence, designed by Giorgio Vasari, begins.
  - Construction of Mexico City Cathedral begins.
  - Reconstruction of Poznań Town Hall in Poland by Giovanni Battista di Quadro is completed.
- 1561
  - Saint Basil's Cathedral, Moscow, designed by Postnik Yakovlev, is completed.
  - The Tian Yi Ge library in Ningbo (Ming dynasty China) is established.
- 1562–64
  - Façade of the church of San Francesco della Vigna in Venice, designed by Andrea Palladio, is built.
  - Church of Santa Maria degli Angeli e dei Martiri in Rome, designed by Michelangelo, is adapted from the Baths of Diocletian.
- 1562–67 – Church of San Pedro and San Pablo, Zacatlán, Sierra Norte de Puebla, Mexico, is built.
- 1562 – Dome of Basilica of Our Lady of Humility, Pistoia, Tuscany, designed by Giorgio Vasari, is built.
- 1563
  - Villa Badoer, one of the Palladian villas of the Veneto designed by Andrea Palladio in 1556, is completed.
  - Construction of El Escorial palace in Spain, designed by Juan de Herrera, begins (completed 1584).
  - Construction of Charlton Park House in England by Henry Knyvet for himself begins (completed 1607).
- 1564
  - Vasari Corridor in Florence, designed by Giorgio Vasari, is built.
  - Somersal Herbert Hall near Ashbourne, Derbyshire, England, is built.
- 1565–66
  - Church of San Giorgio Maggiore in Venice is designed by Palladio and construction begins.
  - Temple of Haw Phra Kaew in Vientiane, Laos, is built.
- 1565–69 – Church of Santo Stefano dei Cavalieri, Pisa, designed by Giorgio Vasari, is built.
- 1565–72 – Humayun's Tomb in Delhi, India is built, probably also including the Afsarwala tomb.
- 1566 – Construction of the city of Valletta on Malta, designed by Francesco Laparelli, begins (March 28).
- 1566–67 – "Stari Most" bridge crossing the Neretva at Mostar in the Ottoman Empire, built by Mimar Hayruddin, is completed.

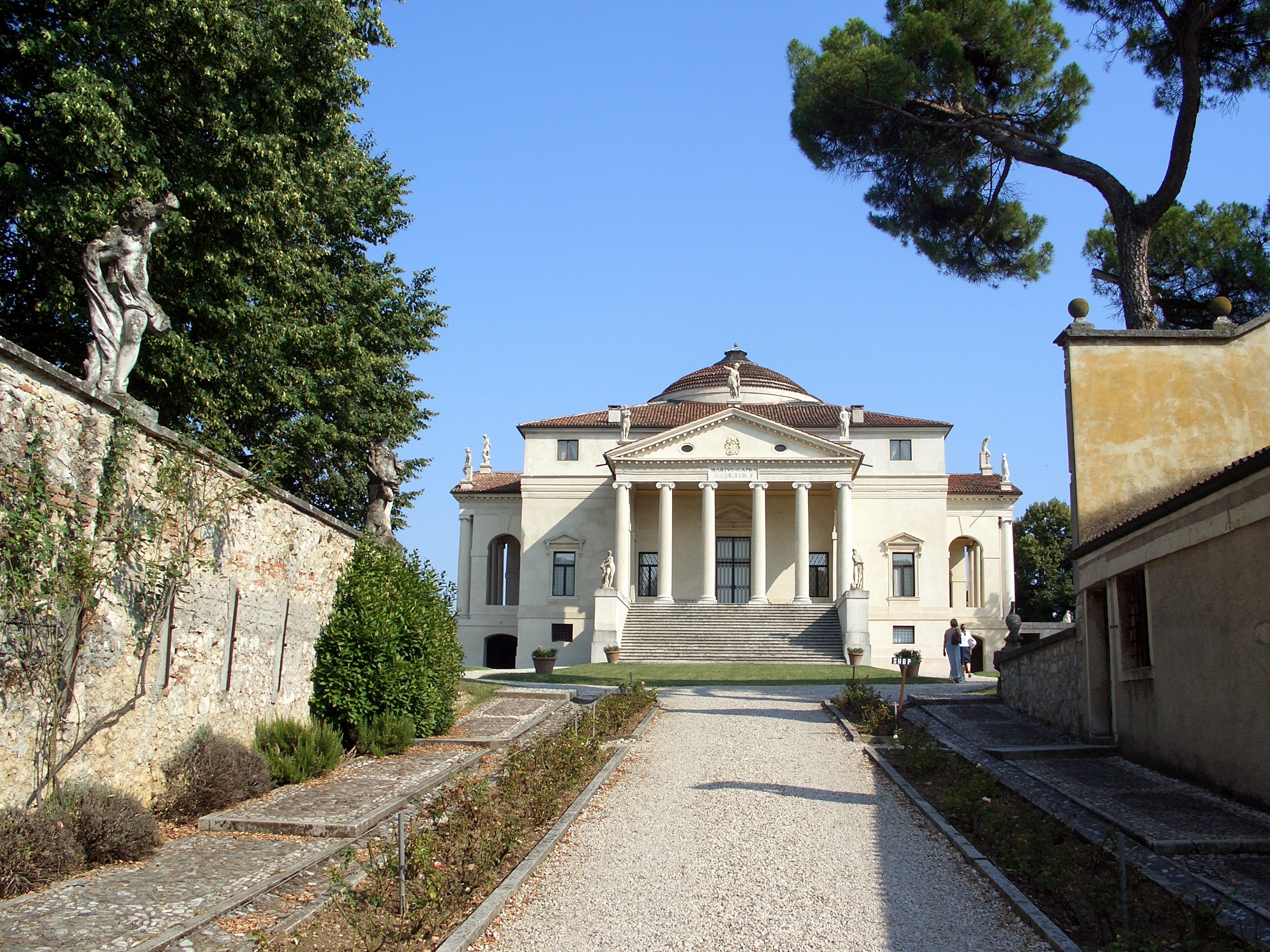
Palladio's Villa Capra "La Rotonda"

- 1567
  - First Royal Exchange, London, completed as the Bourse.
  - Construction of Villa Capra "La Rotonda" in Vicenza, designed by Andrea Palladio, begins.
- 1568
  - The Palace of Charles V in Madrid, Spain, is completed.
  - Construction begins of:
    - Church of the Gesù in Rome, designed by Giacomo Barozzi da Vignola (June 26).
    - Selimiye Mosque in Edirne, Turkey, designed by Mimar Sinan (completed 1574).
    - Longleat House in England, designed by Robert Smythson.

== Events ==
- 1562: Giacomo Barozzi da Vignola – Publication of Regola delli cinque ordini d'architettura (Rules of the Five Orders of Architecture).
- 1563: John Shute – Publication of The First and Chief Groundes of Architecture, the first work in English on architecture.
- 1568: Giorgio Vasari – Second, enlarged, edition published of Le Vite delle più eccellenti pittori, scultori, ed architettori (Lives of the Most Excellent Painters, Sculptors, and Architects).

== Births ==
- 1560 – Lieven de Key, Dutch architect (died 1627)

== Deaths ==
- 1563
  - John Shute, English architect, architectural writer and miniature painter
  - Diego Siloe, Spanish Renaissance architect and sculptor (born 1490)
- 1564: February 18 – Michelangelo (born 1475)
