= 1570 in science =

The year 1570 in science and technology included a number of events, some of which are listed here.

== Astronomy ==
- February 15 – Venus occults Jupiter.

== Cartography ==
- May 20 – Abraham Ortelius publishes Theatrum Orbis Terrarum, the first modern atlas, in Antwerp.
- Jean Cossin publishes a map of the world using sinusoidal projection in Dieppe.

== Earth sciences ==
- February 8 – Concepción earthquake (magnitude 8.3) in Chile.
- Volcanic eruption in the Santorini caldera begins.

== Instruments ==
- Approximate date – Allah-Dad, first of the Lahore family of astrolabists, is at work.

== Mathematics ==
- London haberdasher Henry Billingsley makes the first translation of Euclid's Elements into English (from the Greek), The elements of geometrie of the most ancient philosopher Euclide..., with a preface by John Dee and fold-up diagrams.

== Medicine ==
- January 11 – Francisco Hernández de Toledo is commissioned by Philip II of Spain to write a description of all the medicinal plants found in the American colonies.

== Technology ==
- Giovanni Padovani publishes a detailed treatise on the construction of sundials, Opus de compositione et usu multiformium horologiorum solarium, in Venice

== Deaths ==
- November 5 - Jacques Grévin French physician and playwright (born c. 1539).
