= 1555 in science =

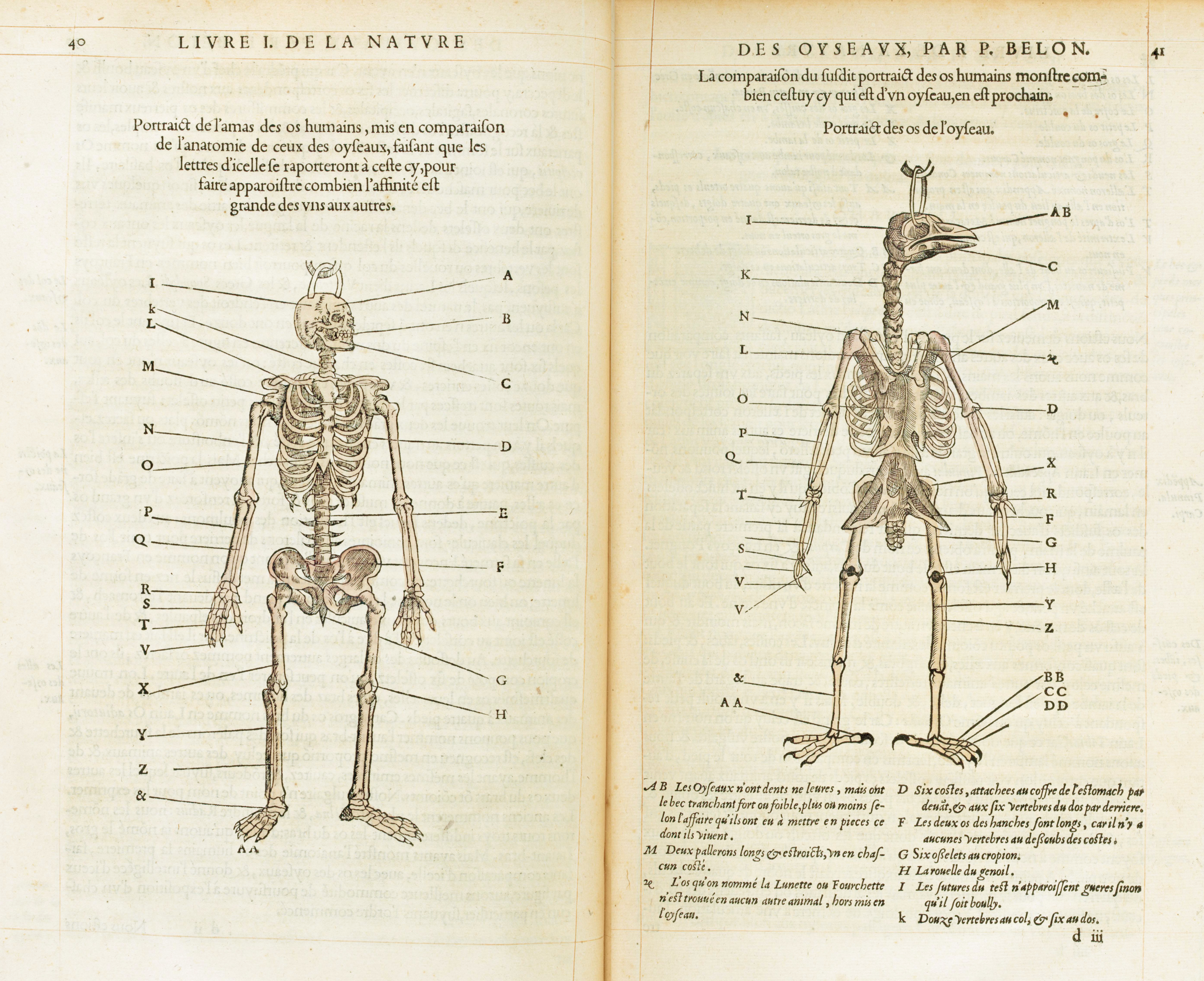
Pierre Belon’s skeleton of a bird and a human being – the first example of comparative anatomy is published

The year 1555 CE in science and technology included a number of events, some of which are listed here.

== Biology ==
- Pierre Belon publishes L'Histoire de la nature des oyseaux, a pioneering work in the comparative anatomy of birds.

== Exploration ==
- Richard Eden publishes The Decades of the Newe Worlde or West India, a translation into English of parts of Pietro Martire d'Anghiera's De orbe novo decades, the Gonzalo Fernández de Oviedo y Valdés work Natural hystoria de las Indias and others.
- Guillaume Le Testu's Cosmographie Universelle selon les navigateurs, tant anciens que modernes contains maps of Terra Australis.

== Mathematics ==
- Petrus Ramus publishes Arithmétique.
- First German translation of Euclid's elements by Johann Scheubel.

== Births ==
- June 13 – Giovanni Antonio Magini, Italian astronomer (died 1617)
- Andreas Libavius, German physician (died 1616)

== Deaths ==
- January 14 – Jacques Dubois, French anatomist (born 1478)
- May 25 – Gemma Frisius, Dutch mathematician and cartographer (born 1508)
- June 23 – Pedro Mascarenhas, Portuguese explorer (born 1470)
- August 8 – Oronce Finé, French mathematician and cartographer (born 1494)
- October 5 – Edward Wotton, English zoologist (born 1492)
- November 21 – Georgius Agricola, German metallurgist (born 1490)
- Petrus Gyllius, French traveller and ichthyologist (born 1490)
