= 1558 in science =

The year 1558 in science and technology included a number of events, some of which are listed here.

== Economics ==
- November – Thomas Gresham states Gresham's law.

== Exploration ==
- English explorer Anthony Jenkinson travels from Moscow to Astrakhan and Bokhara. He is the first Englishman to note that the Amu Darya changed course to start flowing into the Aral Sea.

== Music ==
- Venetian composer Gioseffo Zarlino accurately describes meantone temperament in Le istitutioni harmoniche.

== Publications ==
- Giambattista della Porta publishes the popular science book Magia Naturalis in Naples.
- First publication of Petrus Peregrinus de Maricourt's 13th century Epistola de magnete, edited by Achilles Gasser and printed in Augsburg.

== Awards ==
- September 4 – John Feild receives a confirmation of arms in England and the grant of a crest allusive to his attainments in astronomy.

== Births ==
- Robert Alaine, English astronomer (died 1603)
- André du Laurens, French physician and gerontologist (died 1609)
- Olivier van Noort, Dutch circumnavigator (died 1627)

== Deaths ==
- March 6 – Luca Gaurico, Italian astrologer (born 1476)
- March 6 – Fray Marcos de Niza, Savoyard Franciscan explorer (born c. 1495)
- October 21 – Julius Caesar Scaliger, Italian-born polymath (born 1484)
- Jean Fernel, French physician (born 1497)
- Robert Recorde, Welsh-born physician and mathematician (born c. 1512)
- approx. date
  - Álvar Núñez Cabeza de Vaca, Spanish anthropologist (born c. 1488/90)
