= 1562 in science =

The 1562 map of the Americas titled "Americae sive quartae orbis partis nova et exactissima descriptio" (Latin: "The Americas, or A New and Precise Description of the Fourth Part of the World") by Diego Gutiérrez and engraver Hieronymus Cock. It was the earliest scale wall map of the New World and the first to apply the name California.

The year 1562 in science and technology included a number of events, some of which are listed here.

== Geography ==
- Diego Gutiérrez and Hieronymus Cock published the map Americae Sive Quartae Orbis Partis Nova Et Exactissima Descriptio.

== Mathematics ==
- Humphrey Baker's arithmetic textbook The Wellspring of Sciences first published in London.

== Births ==
- April 24 – Xu Guangqi, Chinese polymath (died 1633)
- October 4 – Christen Sørensen Longomontanus, Danish astronomer (died 1647)

== Deaths ==
- October 9 – Gabriele Falloppio, Italian anatomist and physician (born 1523)
