= 1528 in science =

List of years in science	(table)
- … 1518; 1519; 1520; 1521; 1522; 1523; 1524; 1525; 1526; 1527; 1528; 1529; 1530; 1531; 1532; 1533; 1534; 1535; 1536; 1537; 1538 …
- Art; Archaeology; Architecture; Literature; Music; Philosophy; Science; +...

The year 1528 in science and technology included a number of events, some of which are listed here.

== Events ==
- Paracelsus leaves Basel.

== Exploration ==
- February – Diego García de Moguer explores the Sierra de la Plata along the Río de la Plata and begins to travel up the Paraná River.
- November 6 – Spanish conquistador Álvar Núñez Cabeza de Vaca and his companions become the first Europeans known to set foot on the territory of Texas.
- Jean Fernel publishes Cosmotheoria, including a means of determining a degree of arc of the meridian.

== Medicine ==
- May – The fourth major outbreak of the sweating sickness occurs in England, also spreading to northern Europe.

== Births ==
- October 10 – Adam Lonicer, German botanist, naturalist and physician (died 1586)
- Adam von Bodenstein, Swiss alchemist and physician (died 1577)

== Deaths ==
- April 6 – Albrecht Dürer, German artist and polymath (born 1471)
- Martín Fernández de Enciso, Spanish explorer (born c. 1470)
- Al-Birjandi, Persian astronomer and mathematician
- Giovanni da Verrazzano, Italian-born explorer (born 1485) (killed and eaten by Carib people)
