= 1530 in science =

List of years in science	(table)
- … 1520; 1521; 1522; 1523; 1524; 1525; 1526; 1527; 1528; 1529; 1530; 1531; 1532; 1533; 1534; 1535; 1536; 1537; 1538; 1539; 1540 …
- Art; Archaeology; Architecture; Literature; Music; Philosophy; Science; +...

The year 1530 in science and technology included many events, some of which are listed here.

== Botany ==
- Otto Brunfels begins publication of his illustrated botanical catalogue Herbarium vivae icones, based on his own observations and giving the plants their German vernacular names.

== Earth sciences ==
- Georgius Agricola publishes Bermannus, sive de re metallica dialogus, his first work on scientific metallurgy.

== Mathematics ==
- Approximate date – Jyeṣṭhadeva, a member of the Kerala School of Astronomy and Mathematics in India, writes the Yuktibhāṣā, the world's first known text on the foundations of calculus.

== Medicine ==
- The name syphilis is coined by the Italian physician and poet Girolamo Fracastoro in his epic poem, Syphilis sive morbus gallicus.
- The first book devoted to dentistry, the Artzney Buchlein, is published.

== Births ==
- September 30 – Girolamo Mercuriale, Italian physician (died 1606)
- Mathew Baker, English shipwright (died 1613)
- 1529 or 1530 – Julius Caesar Aranzi, Italian anatomist (died 1589)
- approx. date – Thomas Penny, English botanist and entomologist (died 1589)

== Deaths ==
- Jacopo Berengario da Carpi, Italian anatomist (born 1460)
