= 1531 in science =

List of years in science	(table)
- … 1521; 1522; 1523; 1524; 1525; 1526; 1527; 1528; 1529; 1530; 1531; 1532; 1533; 1534; 1535; 1536; 1537; 1538; 1539; 1540; 1541 …
- Art; Archaeology; Architecture; Literature; Music; Philosophy; Science; +...

The year 1531 in science and technology included many events, some of which are listed here.

== Astronomy ==
- Halley's Comet makes its only appearance this century (Perihelion: August 26).

== Earth sciences ==
- January 26 – Lisbon, Portugal, is hit by an earthquake.

== Technology ==
- Autumn – Kõpu Lighthouse first lit on the Estonian island of Hiiumaa; it will remain in continuous use into the 21st century.

== Births ==
- June 1 – János Zsámboky, Hungarian physician and scholar (died 1584)
- Agostino Ramelli, Italian engineer (died c. 1600)

== Deaths ==
- February 16 – Johannes Stöffler, German mathematician (born 1452)
- March 28 − Nicholas Leonicus Thomaeus, Italian scholar and professor of philosophy (born 1456)
- prob. date – Antonio Pigafetta, Italian circumnavigator (born c. 1491)
