= 1546 in science =

List of years in science	(table)
- … 1536; 1537; 1538; 1539; 1540; 1541; 1542; 1543; 1544; 1545; 1546; 1547; 1548; 1549; 1550; 1551; 1552; 1553; 1554; 1555; 1556 …
- Art; Archaeology; Architecture; Literature; Music; Philosophy; Science; +...

The year 1546 in science and technology included a number of events, some of which are listed here.

== Botany ==
- Hieronymus Bock publishes the second, illustrated, edition of his flora of Germany, the Kreutterbuch.

== Medicine ==
- Antonio Musa Brassavola of Ferrara publishes the first definitely recorded successful tracheostomy.
- Valerius Cordus' pharmacopoeia Dispensatorium published posthumously in Nuremberg.
- Girolamo Fracastoro, in his De Contagione et Contagiosis Morbis (published in Venice), discusses the transmission of infectious diseases and gives the first description of typhus.
- Giovanni Filippo Ingrassia describes the stapes bone of the middle ear.

== Births ==
- December 14 – Tycho Brahe, Danish astronomer (died 1601).
- date unknown
  - Thomas Digges, English astronomer (died 1595)
  - Heo Jun, Korean physician (died 1615)
  - Katharina Kepler, née Guldenmann, German healer and mother of Johannes Kepler (died 1622)
- approx. date – Paul Wittich, German astronomer and mathematician (died 1586)

== Deaths ==
- Ruy López de Villalobos, Spanish explorer (born 1500)
