= 1543 in science =

List of years in science	(table)
- … 1533; 1534; 1535; 1536; 1537; 1538; 1539; 1540; 1541; 1542; 1543; 1544; 1545; 1546; 1547; 1548; 1549; 1550; 1551; 1552; 1553 …
- Art; Archaeology; Architecture; Literature; Music; Philosophy; Science; +...

The year 1543 in science and technology includes the 1543 Nicolaus Copernicus publication De revolutionibus orbium coelestium (On the Revolutions of the Heavenly Spheres) often cited as the beginning of the Scientific Revolution, and also includes many other events, some of which are listed here.

== Astronomy ==
De revolutionibus orbium coelestium by Nicolaus Copernicus

- Nicolaus Copernicus publishes De revolutionibus orbium coelestium (On the Revolutions of the Heavenly Spheres) in Nuremberg, offering entirely abstract mathematical arguments for the existence of the heliocentric universe. It is often cited as the beginning of the Scientific Revolution.

== Mathematics ==
- Robert Recorde publishes The Grounde of Artes, teaching the Worke and Practise of Arithmeticke, both in whole numbers and fractions, one of the first printed elementary arithmetic textbooks in English and the first to cover algebra. It will go through around forty-five editions in the following century and a half.
- Niccolò Fontana Tartaglia publishes a translation of Euclid's Elements into Italian, the first into any modern European language.

== Medicine ==
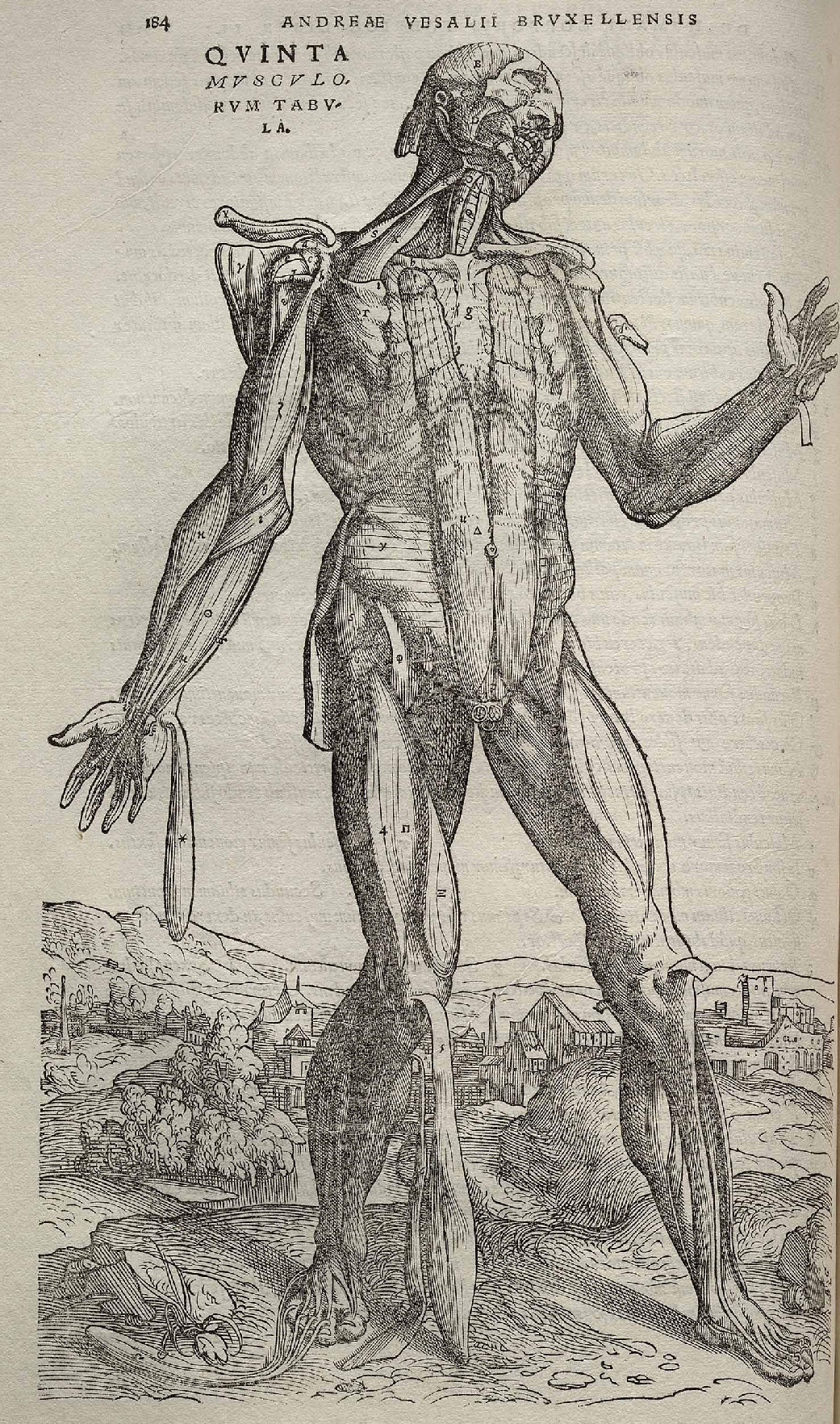
Illustration from De humani corporis fabrica

- Andreas Vesalius publishes De humani corporis fabrica (On the Fabric of the Human Body), illustrated by Jan van Calcar, in Basel, revolutionizing the science of human anatomy. He includes an account of a successful experimental tracheotomy for artificial respiration of a canine subject.

== Technology ==
- Ralf Hogge, working for Rev. William Levett, casts iron cannon at his blast furnace in the Sussex Weald of England.
- Lighthouse of Genoa completed in present form.

== Births ==
- Domenico Fontana (died 1607), Swiss-born architect.
- approximate date – William Clowes (died 1604), English surgeon.

== Deaths ==
- January 3 – Juan Rodríguez Cabrillo (born c. 1499), Portuguese explorer.
- May 24 – Nicolaus Copernicus (born 1473), Polish astronomer.
