= 1527 in science =

List of years in science	(table)
- … 1517; 1518; 1519; 1520; 1521; 1522; 1523; 1524; 1525; 1526; 1527; 1528; 1529; 1530; 1531; 1532; 1533; 1534; 1535; 1536; 1537 …
- Art; Archaeology; Architecture; Literature; Music; Philosophy; Science; +...

The year 1527 in science and technology included a number of events, some of which are listed here.

== Mathematics ==
- Petrus Apianus publishes a handbook of commercial arithmetic, Ein newe und wolgegründete underweisung aller Kauffmanns Rechnung in dreyen Büchern, mit schönen Regeln und fragstücken begriffen, at Ingolstadt.

== Military science ==
- Albrecht Dürer publishes a treatise on fortifications, Etliche underricht zu Befestigung der Stett, Schloss und Flecken, in Nuremberg.

== Births ==
- c. May 1 – Jan Van Ostaeyen (Johannes Stadius), Flemish mathematician and astronomer (died 1579)
- July 13 – John Dee, English alchemist, astrologer and mathematician (died 1609)

== Deaths ==
- January 21 – Juan de Grijalva, Spanish explorer (born c. 1489)
- July 28 – Rodrigo de Bastidas, Spanish explorer (born c. 1460)
