= 1542 in science =

List of years in science	(table)
- … 1532; 1533; 1534; 1535; 1536; 1537; 1538; 1539; 1540; 1541; 1542; 1543; 1544; 1545; 1546; 1547; 1548; 1549; 1550; 1551; 1552 …
- Art; Archaeology; Architecture; Literature; Music; Philosophy; Science; +...

The year 1542 in science and technology included a number of events, some of which are listed here.

== Botany ==
- Leonhart Fuchs publishes his new herbal De historia stirpium commentarii insignes in Basel.

== Exploration ==
- Juan Rodríguez Cabrillo explores the coast of California.

== Physiology and medicine ==
- Jean Fernel publishes De naturali parte medicinae, presenting human physiology as integral to the study of medicine.

== Births ==
- approx. date – Peder Sørensen, Danish physician (died 1602)

== Deaths ==
- August – Peter Henlein, Nuremberg watchmaker (born 1479/80)
