= 1544 in science =

List of years in science	(table)
- … 1534; 1535; 1536; 1537; 1538; 1539; 1540; 1541; 1542; 1543; 1544; 1545; 1546; 1547; 1548; 1549; 1550; 1551; 1552; 1553; 1554 …
- Art; Archaeology; Architecture; Literature; Music; Philosophy; Science; +...

The year 1544 in science and technology involved some significant events.

== Botany ==
- Orto botanico di Pisa botanical garden established by Cosimo I de' Medici, Grand Duke of Tuscany, under the direction of Luca Ghini, who also creates the first herbarium.
- Publication of Valerius Cordus' herbal Historia Plantarum.
- Publication of Pietro Andrea Mattioli's Discorsi ("Commentaries") on the Materia Medica of Dioscorides, adding descriptions of some plants not of medical use, including the first reference to the tomato in Europe.

== Geography ==
- Sebastian Münster's description of the world, Cosmographia, is published in Basel.

== Geology ==
- Georgius Agricola publishes De ortu et causis subterraneorum, laying the foundations of modern physical geology.

== Geophysics ==
- Magnetic dip is first described in Europe by Georg Hartmann.

== Mathematics ==
- Michael Stifel's Arithmetica integra is published in Nuremberg, containing the first European use of multiplication by juxtaposition, the first use of the term exponent, and a table of integers and powers of two considered as an early version of a logarithmic table.

== Zoology ==
- William Turner's Avium praecipuarum, quarum apud Plinium et Aristotelem mentio est, brevis et succincta historia is published in Cologne, the first printed book devoted entirely to ornithology.

== Births ==
- Joseph Duchesne, French physician and alchemist (died 1609).

== Deaths ==
- September 24 – Valerius Cordus, German physician and botanist (born 1515).
- Nilakantha Somayaji, Keralan mathematician and astronomer (born 1444).
