= 1540 in science =

List of years in science	(table)
- … 1530; 1531; 1532; 1533; 1534; 1535; 1536; 1537; 1538; 1539; 1540; 1541; 1542; 1543; 1544; 1545; 1546; 1547; 1548; 1549; 1550 …
- Art; Archaeology; Architecture; Literature; Music; Philosophy; Science; +...

The year 1540 in science and technology included a number of events, some of which are listed here.

== Astronomy ==
- Georg Joachim Rheticus publishes De libris revolutionum Copernici narratio prima in Danzig, an abstract of Copernicus' as yet unpublished De revolutionibus orbium coelestium and the first printed publication of Copernican heliocentrism.
- Peter Apian publishes Astronomicon Caesareum. The tails of comets always point away from the sun.
- Alessandro Piccolomini De Le Stelle Fisse is the first star atlas in which stars are labelled with letters.

== Chemistry ==
- Valerius Cordus discovers and describes a method of synthesizing ether ("oleum dulci vitrioli") by adding sulfuric acid to ethyl alcohol.

== Exploration ==
- May 9 – Hernando de Alarcón sets sail to explore the Baja California peninsula; on September 26 he enters the Colorado River.

== Metallurgy ==
- Vannoccio Biringuccio's manual on metalworking, De la pirotechnia, is published posthumously.

== Physiology and medicine ==
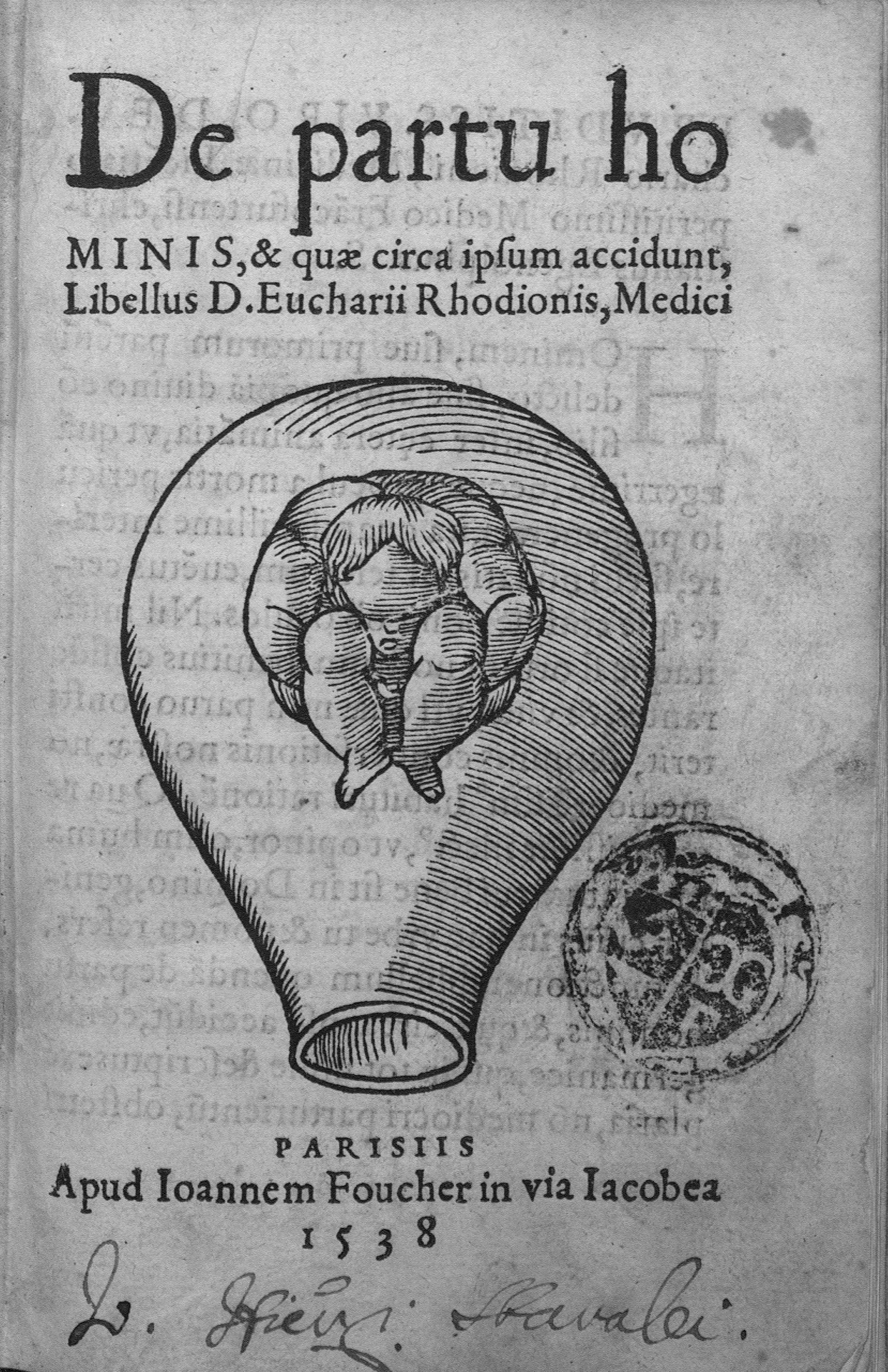
De partu hominis

- Publication in London of the first printed book in English on obstetrics, The Byrth of Mankynde, a translation attributed to Richard Jonas from Rösslin's De partu hominis. It will continue to be issued in new editions for more than a century.
- Publication in Lyon of the first translation into French by Pierre Tolet of the sixth book devoted to Surgery of the Medical Compendium in Seven Books by Paul of Aegina.

== Births ==
- January 28 – Ludolph van Ceulen, German mathematician (died 1610).
- c. February or March – Francis Drake, English explorer (died 1596).
- Roch Le Baillif, French physician (died 1598).
- François Viète, French mathematician (died 1603).
- possible date – Pieter Dirkszoon Keyser, Frisian navigator (died 1596).

== Deaths ==
- probable date – Johann Georg Faust, German alchemist (born 1480).
