= 1541 in science =

List of years in science	(table)
- … 1531; 1532; 1533; 1534; 1535; 1536; 1537; 1538; 1539; 1540; 1541; 1542; 1543; 1544; 1545; 1546; 1547; 1548; 1549; 1550; 1551 …
- Art; Archaeology; Architecture; Literature; Music; Philosophy; Science; +...

The year 1541 in science and technology included a number of events, some of which are listed here.

== Cartography ==
- Gerardus Mercator makes his first terrestrial globe, for Charles V, Holy Roman Emperor.
- Georg Joachim Rheticus publishes Tabula chorographica auff Preussen und etliche umbliegende lender in Wittenberg.

== Exploration ==
- May 8 – Spanish explorer Hernando de Soto reaches the Mississippi River, naming it Rio de Espiritu Santo.
- May 23 – French explorer Jacques Cartier departs from Saint-Malo on his third voyage.

== Medicine ==
- Jacques Dubois publishes In Hippocratis et Galeni Physiologiae partem anatomicam isagoge in Paris and Vesalius publishes Anatomicarum institutionum ex Galeni sententia, libri III .. His accesserunt Theophili Protospatarii, De corporis humani fabrica, libri V. Item Hippocratis Coi De medicates purgatories, libellus nunquam ante nostra tempora inlucem editus in Lyon.

== Births ==
- April 8 – Michele Mercati, Italian physician and botanist (died 1593)
- December 12 – Johann Bauhin, Swiss physician and botanist (died 1613)
- David Gans, German Jewish mathematician and astronomer (died 1613)
- Guðbrandur Þorláksson, Icelandic mathematician and cartographer (died 1627)

== Deaths ==
- April 24 – Celio Calcagnini, Ferraran polymath (born 1479)
- September 24 – Paracelsus, Swiss alchemist and physician (born 1493)
- Hernando de Alarcón, Spanish navigator (born 1500)
