= 1545 in science =

List of years in science	(table)
- … 1535; 1536; 1537; 1538; 1539; 1540; 1541; 1542; 1543; 1544; 1545; 1546; 1547; 1548; 1549; 1550; 1551; 1552; 1553; 1554; 1555 …
- Art; Archaeology; Architecture; Literature; Music; Philosophy; Science; +...

The year 1545 in science and technology involved some significant events.

== Botany ==
- Orto botanico di Padova and di Firenze botanical gardens established.

== Mathematics ==
- Gerolamo Cardano publishes his algebra text Ars Magna, including the first published solutions to cubic and quartic equations.

== Navigation ==
- Pedro de Medina's Arte de navegar is published in Valladolid, the first treatise on the art of navigation to be published in Europe.

== Physiology and medicine ==
- Charles Estienne publishes De dissectione partium corporis humani, libri tres, including a description of the venous valves of the liver.
- Ambroise Paré publishes his first book, a treatise on battlefield medicine, La méthode de traicter les playes faictes par hacquebutes et aultres bastons à feu et de celles qui sont faictes par flèches, dardz et semblables, in Paris.
- Thomas Phaer publishes The Boke of Chyldren, the first book on paediatrics written in English.

== Zoology ==
- The giant squid (Architeuthis) is first seen.

== Births ==
- January 11 – Guidobaldo del Monte, Italian mathematician (died 1607)
- March – Gaspare Tagliacozzi, Italian anatomist (died 1599)
- John Gerard, English botanist (died 1612)

== Deaths ==
- Christoph Rudolff, Silesian mathematician (born 1499)
