= 1522 in science =

List of years in science	(table)
- … 1512; 1513; 1514; 1515; 1516; 1517; 1518; 1519; 1520; 1521; 1522; 1523; 1524; 1525; 1526; 1527; 1528; 1529; 1530; 1531; 1532 …
- Art; Archaeology; Architecture; Literature; Music; Philosophy; Science; +...

The year 1522 in science and technology included a number of events, some of which are listed here.

== Exploration ==
- September 6 – The Victoria (nau Vittoria), one of the surviving ships of the Magellan expedition, returns to Sanlúcar de Barrameda in Spain under the command of Juan Sebastián Elcano, becoming the first ship to circumnavigate the world. It carries the first (dead) examples of the bird-of-paradise ever to be seen in Europe. Venetian cardinal Gasparo Contarini, in Spain at this time, is the first European to give a correct explanation of the one-day discrepancy in dates observed by the crew on their return.

== Mathematics ==
- Adam Ries publishes his popular arithmetical text Rechenung auff der Linihen und Federn.
- Johannes Werner's original work on conic sections is published.

== Medicine ==
- Publication in Seville, by Juan Varela and under the title of Metaphora medicinae, of a manual of medicine and pharmacy by Bernardino de Laredo.

== Births ==
- September 11 – Ulisse Aldrovandi, Italian naturalist (died 1605)

== Deaths ==
- May – Johannes Werner, German polymath (born 1468)
