= 1547 in science =

List of years in science	(table)
- … 1537; 1538; 1539; 1540; 1541; 1542; 1543; 1544; 1545; 1546; 1547; 1548; 1549; 1550; 1551; 1552; 1553; 1554; 1555; 1556; 1557 …
- Art; Archaeology; Architecture; Literature; Music; Philosophy; Science; +...

The year 1547 in science and technology included a number of events, some of which are listed here.

== Events ==
- John Dee visits the Low Countries to study navigation with Gemma Frisius.
- The first chair of mathematics at the University of Heidelberg is given to the physician Jacob Curio.
- Charles de Bovelles publishes La Geometrie practique in Paris, with assistance from Oronce Finé.
- Girolamo Gabuccini publishes the first separate treatise on parasitic worms.

== Births ==
- February 18 – Bahāʾ al-dīn al-ʿĀmilī, Lebanese-born philosopher and astronomer (died 1621)
- March 1 – Rudolph Goclenius, German philosopher and polymath (died 1628)
- November 26 – Nicolaus Taurellus, German philosopher and scientist (died 1606)

== Deaths ==
- January 16 – Johannes Schöner, German astronomer and cartographer (born 1477)
- December 2 – Hernán Cortés, Spanish explorer (born 1485)
