= 1548 in science =

| List of years in science | (table) |
- … 1538; 1539; 1540; 1541; 1542; 1543; 1544; 1545; 1546; 1547; 1548; 1549; 1550; 1551; 1552; 1553; 1554; 1555; 1556; 1557; 1558 …
- Art; Archaeology; Architecture; Literature; Music; Philosophy; Science; +...

The year 1548 in science and technology included a number of events, some of which are listed here.

== Events ==
- February 14 – Battle of Uedahara: Firearms are used for the first time on the battlefield in Japan.
- August 10 – Debate in Milan between mathematicians Lodovico Ferrari and Niccolò Fontana Tartaglia concerning the algebraic method for resolving third-degree equations.
- John Dee starts to study at the Katholieke Universiteit Leuven.

== Publications ==
- Georgius Agricola – De animantibus subterraneis
- Valerius Cordus – Pharmacorum conficiendorum ratio (posthumous)
- Rembert Dodoens – Cosmographica in astronomiam et geographiam isagoge
- Gemma Frisius – De Orbis divisione et insulis rebusque nuper inventis
- William Turner – The names of herbes in Greke, Latin, Englishe Duche and Frenche wyth the commune names that Herbaries and Apotecaries use

== Births ==
- April 15 – Pietro Cataldi, Italian mathematician (died 1626)
- Giordano Bruno, Italian Dominican friar, philosopher, mathematician, poet, astrologer and astronomer (k. 1600)
- Abul Qasim ibn Mohammed al-Ghassani, Moroccan physician (died 1610)
- approx. date – Simon Stevin, Flemish scientist (died 1620)
