= 1521 in science =

| List of years in science | (table) |
- … 1511; 1512; 1513; 1514; 1515; 1516; 1517; 1518; 1519; 1520; 1521; 1522; 1523; 1524; 1525; 1526; 1527; 1528; 1529; 1530; 1531 …
- Art; Archaeology; Architecture; Literature; Music; Philosophy; Science; +...

The year 1521 in science and technology included many events, some of which are listed here.

== Astronomy ==
- January – Antonio Pigafetta, sailing with Magellan's expedition, observes Magellanic Clouds.

== Exploration ==
- Francisco de Gordillo explores the Atlantic coast up to South Carolina.
- March 6 – Ferdinand Magellan discovers Guam in the Mariana Islands.
- March 16 – Magellan reaches the Philippines.
- April 7 – Magellan arrives at Cebu Island.
- November 8 – Magellan's expedition, now led by Juan Sebastián Elcano, arrives in the Maluku Islands.

== Medicine ==
- Jacopo Berengario da Carpi publishes Commentaria cum amplissimus additionibus super anatomiam Mundini in Bologna, containing the first printed anatomical illustrations taken from nature and including observation of the vermiform appendix.

== Births ==
- Valentin Mennher, German mathematician (d. c.1571).
- approx. date – Richard Chancellor, English Arctic explorer (drowned 1556).

== Deaths ==
- April 27 – Ferdinand Magellan, Portuguese explorer (born c.1480) (killed in the Philippines).
- July 8 – Jorge Álvares, Portuguese explorer.
- Francisco Serrão, Portuguese explorer.
