= 1551 in science =

| List of years in science | (table) |
- … 1541; 1542; 1543; 1544; 1545; 1546; 1547; 1548; 1549; 1550; 1551; 1552; 1553; 1554; 1555; 1556; 1557; 1558; 1559; 1560; 1561 …
- Art; Archaeology; Architecture; Literature; Music; Philosophy; Science; +...

== Astronomy ==
- Publication of Erasmus Reinhold's ephemeris, the Tabulae prutenicae, helping to disseminate Copernican methods of astronomical calculation.

== Botany ==
- Bolognese naturalist Ulisse Aldrovandi begins to collect plants for a herbarium.
- William Turner publishes the first part of A New Herball, wherin are conteyned the names of herbes... in London.

== Mathematics ==
- Georg Joachim Rheticus publishes Canon of the Science of Triangles.

== Medicine ==
- By July – Fifth and last outbreak of sweating sickness in England. Dr. John Caius writes the first full contemporary account of the symptoms of the disease.
- Conrad Gessner is the first to describe adipose tissue.

== Zoology ==
- Pierre Belon publishes Histoire naturelle des estranges poissons.
- Conrad Gessner begins publication of his encyclopedic illustrated Historiae animalium in Zurich.

== Publications ==
- Martín Cortés de Albacar publishes Breve compendio de la esfera y del arte de navegar in Spain, an influential work in cosmography, proposing spherical charts and mentioning magnetic deviation and the existence of magnetic poles.

== Births ==
- approx. date – Timothy Bright, English physician (died 1615)

== Deaths ==
- April 6 – Joachim Vadian, Swiss physician and polymath (born 1484)
- May 6 − Johannes Baptista Montanus Italian physician and humanist (born 1498)
- August 8 – Fray Tomás de Berlanga, Spanish Bishop of Panama and discoverer of the Galápagos Islands (born 1487)
