= 1550 in science =

List of years in science	(table)
- … 1540; 1541; 1542; 1543; 1544; 1545; 1546; 1547; 1548; 1549; 1550; 1551; 1552; 1553; 1554; 1555; 1556; 1557; 1558; 1559; 1560 …
- Art; Archaeology; Architecture; Literature; Music; Philosophy; Science; +...

== Medicine ==
- approx. date – Establishment of St Thomas's Hospital Medical School in London.

== Technology ==
- Commencement of laying out of gardens at the Villa d'Este, Tivoli, Italy, for Cardinal Ippolito II d'Este with sophisticated hydraulic features designed by Tommaso Chiruchi with Claude Venard.

== Publications ==
- Gerolamo Cardano publishes his comprehensive survey of the natural sciences, De subtilitate, in Nuremberg.
- Giovanni Battista Ramusio begins publication of Navigationi et Viaggi ("Navigations and Travels"), a collection of explorers' first-hand accounts of their travels, the first work of its kind.

== Births ==
- September 30 – Michael Maestlin, German astronomer and mathematician (died 1631)
- John Napier, Scottish mathematician (died 1617)
- Anselmus de Boodt, Flemish mineralogist and physician (died 1632)
- Jacques Guillemeau, French surgeon (died 1613)
- Ferrante Imperato, Neapolitan natural historian (died 1625)
- approximate date
  - Willem Barentsz, Dutch explorer (died 1597)
  - Marin le Bourgeoys, French inventor and artist (died c.1634)

== Deaths ==
- Sulaiman Al Mahri, Arab navigator (born 1480 AD)
