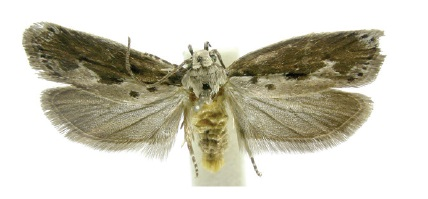

Scientific classification
- Domain: Eukaryota
- Kingdom: Animalia
- Phylum: Arthropoda
- Class: Insecta
- Order: Lepidoptera
- Family: Depressariidae
- Genus: Ethmia
- Species: E. tilneyorum

Binomial name
- Ethmia tilneyorum Phillips, 2014

= Ethmia tilneyorum =

Species of moth

Ethmia tilneyorum is a moth in the family Depressariidae. It is found in Costa Rica, where it has been recorded from the Pacific slope of the Cordillera Volcánica de Guanacaste and on the Península de Nicoya at altitudes between 50 and 160 meters (160 and 520 ft). Its habitat consists of dry forests.

The length of the forewings is 8.9–10.3 mm (0.35–0.41 in) for males and 8.7–10.4 mm (0.34–0.41 in) for females.

The larvae feed on Cordia gerascanthus.

== Etymology ==
The species is named in honor of Lou and Molly Tilney for their support of the Área de Conservación Guanacaste land purchase.
