= Bouchut =

Bouchut may refer to:

- Christophe Bouchut (1966-), a French race driver
- Eugène Bouchut (1818-1891), a French physician
