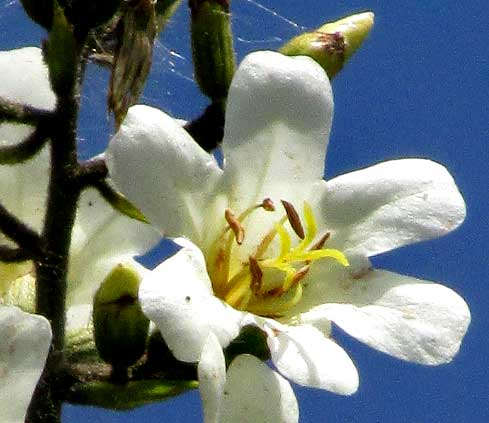
- Cordia gerascanthus flower

Scientific classification
- Kingdom: Plantae
- Clade: Embryophytes
- Clade: Tracheophytes
- Clade: Spermatophytes
- Clade: Angiosperms
- Clade: Eudicots
- Clade: Asterids
- Order: Boraginales
- Family: Cordiaceae
- Genus: Cordia
- Species: C. gerascanthus

Binomial name
- Cordia gerascanthus L.

Synonyms
- List: Cerdana gerascanthus (L.) Moldenke; Cordia gerascanthus f. genuina Chodat; Gerascanthus lanceolatus J.Presl; Gerascanthus vulgaris Mart.; Lithocardium gerascanthus (L.) Kuntze; Cordia bracteata A.DC.; Cordia geraschanthoides Kunth; Cordia langlassei Loes.; Cordia rothschuhii Loes.; Gerascanthus gerascanthoides (Kunth) Borhidi; Lithocardium bracteatum (A.DC.) Kuntze; Lithocardium gerascanthodes (Kunth) Kuntze; Purkinjia nodosa C.Presl

= Cordia gerascanthus =

Species of plant

Cordia gerascanthus, sharing the names Spanish elm and princewood with other species, is a tree occurring in Mexico, Central America and the Caribbean. It belongs to the mostly tropical and subtropical family Cordiaceae'.

== Description ==
Cordia gerascanthus is a handsome, useful tree standing up to 15 m (49 ft) tall. Here are some of its most notable features:

- Leaves are deciduous and hairless, on petioles up to 3 cm (1 1/4 in) long. Blades are long-elliptic to somewhat narrowly egg-shaped, up to 20 cm (7 3/4 in) long and 8.5 cm (3 1/4 in) wide.
- Inflorescences are panicles up to 9 cm (3 1/2 in) wide occurring at branch tips. Branches are densely hairy.
- Flowers occur in two distinct flower types on different trees: one with long styles and short stamens, the other with short styles and long stamens. (This promotes cross-pollination by insects.) Calyxes are tubular, 10-ribbed, variously hairy, and up to 9.8 mm (3/8 in) long. Corollas are white, the bottom part cylindrical, the top with lobes up to 13 mm (1/2 in) long and 8 mm (3/8 in) wide. Styles in long-styled flowers up to 17 mm (5/8 in) long; the 5 stamens in short-styled flowers up to 21 mm (7/8 in) long.
- One-seeded fruits are enclosed by the persistent calyx and corolla, brown, up to 8 mm (3/8 in) long and half that wide. During fruit dispersal, the brown, dried, persisting calyx and corolla apparently serve as small parachutes helping the wind carry the fruits to new locations.

NOTE: Cordia gerascanthus shows geographic variation in several characteristics which generally are fixed within other species. Populations in the Greater Antilles usually flower while the plants have leaves, while mainland populations generally flower when leafless.

== Distribution ==
In Mexico, Cordia gerascanthus occurs from Jalisco state southward on the Pacific side, and from Tamaulipas state southward on the Caribbean side. In Central America it occurs as far south as Costa Rica, plus it extends into the Greater Antilles. It is introduced in west-central Tropical Africa, and in tropical Asia in Malesia and the Philippines .

== Habitat ==
Cordia gerascanthus inhabits dry forests from sea level to 1,000 m (3,300 ft) in elevation In Honduras it occurs in extremely rocky places in subtropical dry forest in shallow, sandy soils, mostly in second-growth forests.

== Ecology ==
Cordia gerascanthus is recognized as an important nectar producer for a wide variety of pollinators. An aspect of the nectar production is that the flowering of the tree is highly synchronized with other trees in the area.

In Honduras it appears naturally mixed among other trees of economic value, such as a mahogany species, Swietenia humilis, and the tigerwood, Astronium graveolens.

=== Pollination ===
Fragrant flowers of Cordia gerascanthus are much visited by hummingbirds and many insects, especially bees.

== Human uses ==
=== In traditional medicine ===
In Cuba an infusion of the leaves to used to treat cataracts, and against respiratory problems. A decoction of the root is used to treat epilepsy.

=== As an ornamental ===
In Mexico's Yucatan Peninsula, the fragrant flowers of Cordia gerascanthus open in March, "covering the trees so densely that their crowns look like mounds of snow." The species is described as having a potential for serving as an ornamental tree.

=== For honey production ===
In Mexico's Yucatan Peninsula, where the Mayan people traditionally often keep bees, honey from Cordia gerascanthus is known to make a good quality honey.

=== For its wood ===
Cordia gerascanthus is recognized as producing an exceptionally good wood for a wide variety of uses, including fine furniture, cabinetry, flooring, veneer, boat building, construction of guitars, turned objects like knife handles, and more. It displays these features:

- Its grain pattern features striking "zebra-like" dark brown to black streaks against a lighter yellowish-brown background, and often it exhibits small growth swirls and attrative "eye" figures.
- Its colors darken significantly with age.
- It has a high natural luster and oily appearance.
- It is moderately durable, the heartwood showing good resistance to decay, but is susceptible to insect attack in certain environments.
- It has a hardness rating of 2,010 "pound of force" (lbf), which is "very hard."

== Taxonomy ==
Of the four sections currently recognized for the genus Cordia, C. gerascanthus is assigned to the Section Gerascanthus, which is characterized by tubular, ribbed calyxes and corollas which turn brown and persist on the fruit.

== Etymology ==
The genus name Cordia honors father and son Euricius Cordus and Valerius Cordus, both German botanists.

It's unclear why Linnaeus chose the species name gerascanthus. The geras- appears to be a form of the Greek adjective γερον, or geron, meaning "old," with an extended meaning of "esteemed, distinguished." The -canthus must derive from the Greek ákanthos, of which one meaning refers to a prickly herb of the Mediterranean region, and another meaning is "an ornamentation suggesting the leaves of the acanthus plant," as seen in the acanthus ornamentation atop Corinthian-style Greek columns. Thus, one can visualize the interpretation "impressive like the acanthus ornamentation atop a Greek column," which might come to mind of anyone who sees Cordia gerascanthus in full bloom, when "...their crowns look like mounds of snow," as the botanist Paul Carpenter Standley wrote in his early Flora of the Yucatan.

== Gallery ==
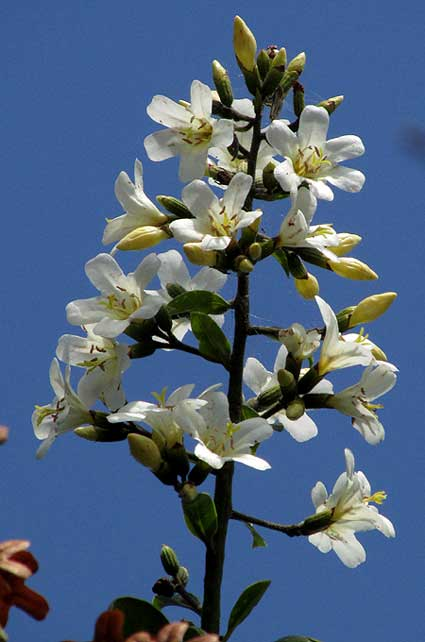
Cordia gerascanthus flowering branch tip

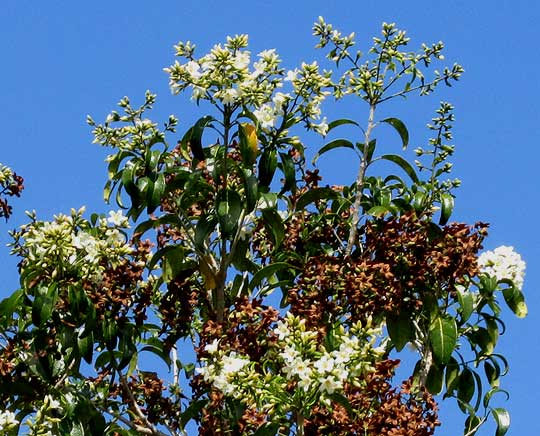
Cordia gerascanthus mixed white and brown corollas

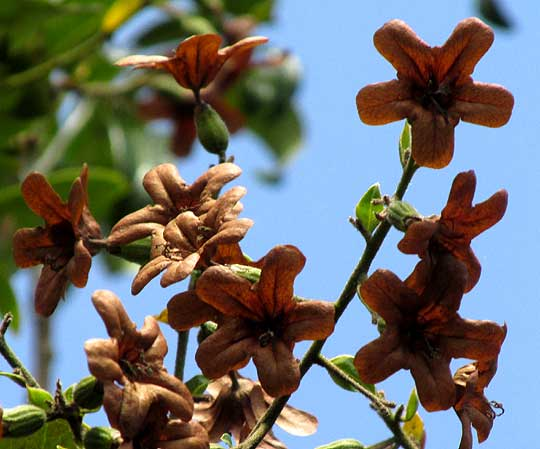
Cordia gerascanthus brown corollas on branch

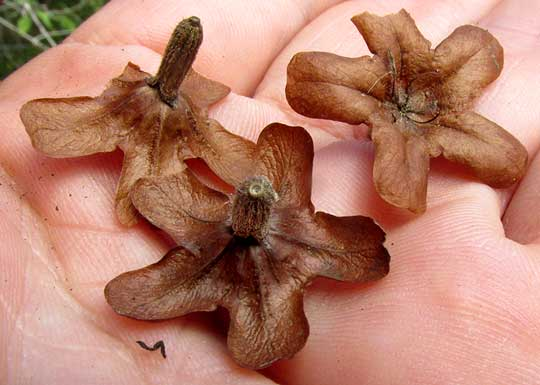
Cordia gerascanthus fallen fruits surrounded by withered brown corollas

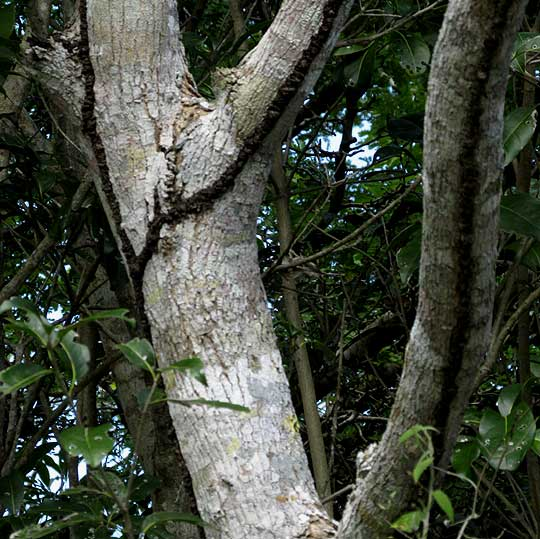
Cordia gerascanthus termite tunnels on trunk

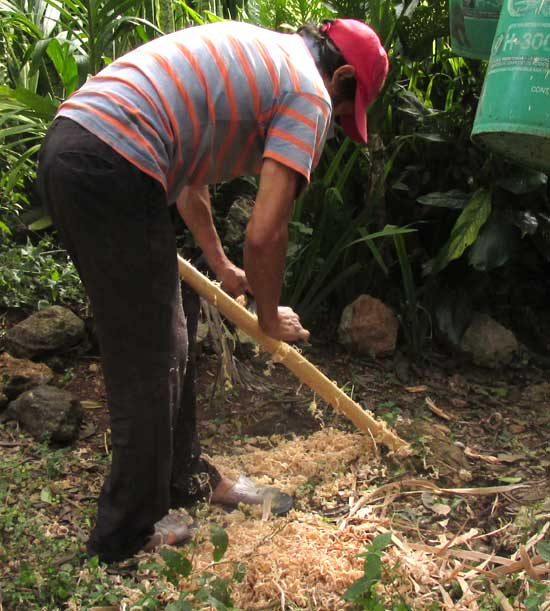
Cordia gerascanthus young stem becoming an ax handle made by Maya rancher
