= Georg Bartisch =

German physician (1535–1607)

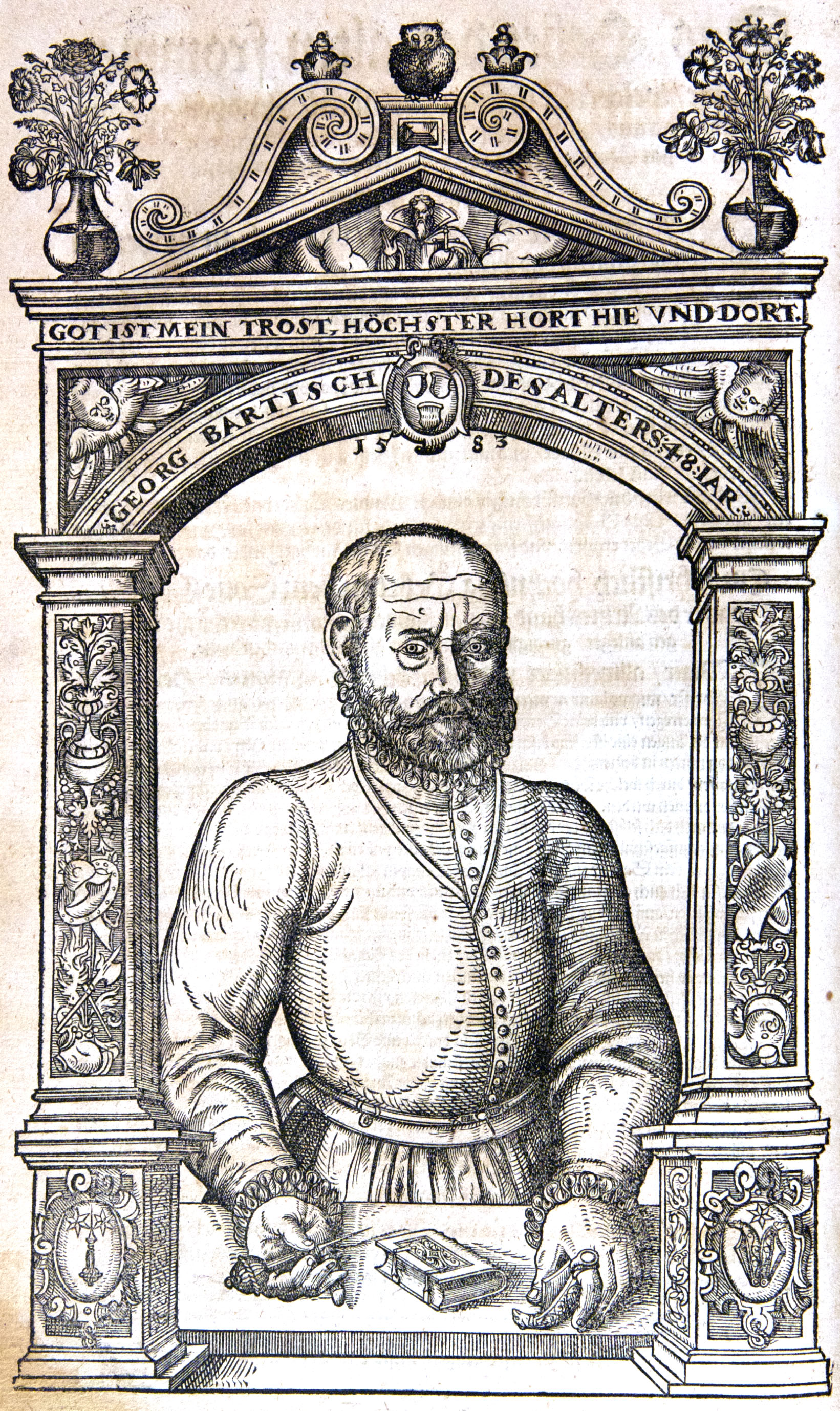
- Born: 1535
- Died: 1607 (aged 71–72)
- Occupation: Physician

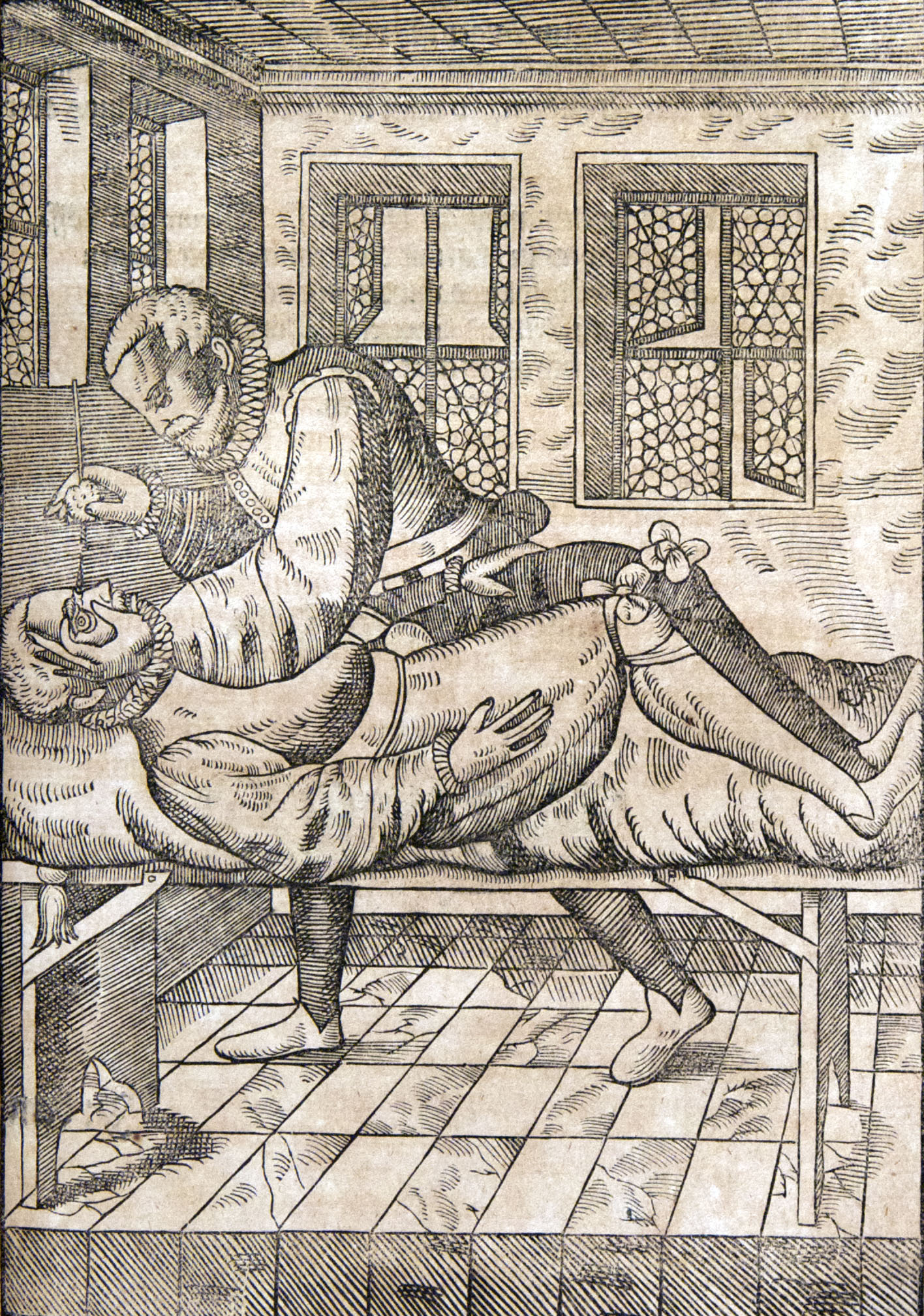
Surgeon at work (1583)

Georg Bartisch (1535–1607) was a German physician who was a native of Königsbrück, Saxony.

At the age of thirteen he began his medical career as an apprentice to a barber surgeon, and for a considerable portion of his life Bartisch was an itinerant surgeon who plied his trade throughout Saxony, Silesia, and Bohemia. He eventually settled down in Dresden, and in 1588 became court oculist to Duke Augustus I of Saxony.

Although Bartisch was not academically trained, he was considered a highly skilled practitioner of ocular medicine and surgery. He is credited for producing the first Renaissance manuscript on ophthalmic disorders and eye surgery, "Ophthalmodouleia Das ist Augendienst". It was published in 1583, and discussed ocular diseases, surgical techniques and instruments, and contained an ophthalmic atlas of 92 woodcuts depicting diseases of the eye. Bartisch is also remembered for his work in lithotomy for the removal of urinary calculi.

Despite his skill as a surgeon, Bartisch was a superstitious individual, as he believed that magic, astrology and witchcraft played a significant part in medicine.
