= Federico Grisogono =

Federico Grisogono, Federico Crisogono, Latinized as Federicus De Chrysogonis (1472 – 2 February 1538) was a renaissance Dalmatian astrologer, physician, geometer, and humanistic philosopher.

Grisogono was born into aristocracy, the son of Antonio and Catarina Giorgi of Zadar (Zara). Orphaned at the age of five but with a large inheritance, he was raised by an uncle Franjo. He studied in Italy and France, attended classes in philosophy and medicine at the University of Padua where a maternal cousin, Jeronim Civalleli, was rector. In 1499, he served as a condottiero and fought in Lombardy. He returned to his studies and received a medical doctorate around 1506–7. He then taught astrology and mathematics at Padua before returning to Zadar. He examined the patterns of tides and noting that it was due to the sun and the moon came up with an approach to predicting the tides. He published the Speculum astronomicum (1507) as well as a book on humanistic philosophy De modo collegiandi...de humana felicitate (1528).
