= Roch Le Baillif =

French physician

Roch Le Baillif, Sieur de la Riviere (1540 in Falaise (Calvados) – 1598) was a French physician, influenced by Paracelsianism. He was prosecuted for practicing medicine contrary to the official teaching of the Sorbonne.

== Works ==
- Le Brief Discours sur la signification veridique du Comette apparu en Occident au signe du Sagittaire. Rennes: Jean le gascon, en 1577.
- Le Demosterion de Roch le Baillif , edelphe medecin spagiric, auquel sont contenuz trois cens Aphorismes latins et français. Sommaire véritable de la médecine Paracelsique, extraicte de luy en la plus part par ledict Baillif. Rennes: Piere Le Bret, 1578.
- Responsio ad quæstiones propositas a Medicis Parisiensis. Paris, 1579.
- Sommaire traicté apologic en forme de Defence de Roc Le Baillif Sieur de La Rivière Conseiller et Medecin Ordinaire du Roy et de Monseigneur Duc de Mercœur, aux demandes des docteurs, et Faculté de médecine de Paris. Paris: Abel l’Angelier, 1579.
- Traicté du remede à la peste, charbon et pleuresie, et du moyen de cognoistre quel Element les excite, et les hommes qui pour le temps y sont assbjettiz. Paris: Abel l’Angelier, 1580.
- Premier Traicté de l'homme et son essentielle anatomie avec les Elemens et ce qui est en eux. Paris: Abel l’Angelier, 1580.
- Briefve démonstration de la cause des fiebvres, varieté d’opinions, et contradiction sur icelles. Rennes: Michel Logeroys, 1591.
- Traicté de la cause de la briefve vie de plusieurs Princes Grands, et le moyen d’y pourvoir. Rennes: Michel Logeroys, 1591.
