= Peder Sørensen =

Danish physician (1542–1602)

Peder Sørensen (1542–1602), widely known by his Latinized name, Petrus Severinus, was a Danish physician, and one of the most significant followers of Paracelsus. His works include the major treatise Idea medicinae philosophicae (Ideal of Philosophical Medicine) (1571), which asserted the superiority of the ideas of Paracelsus to those of Galen. Severinus was a member of Denmark's intellectual elite. His education was supported by the Danish crown and his eventual appointment as royal physician conferred status and authority to his work and opinions. He was a contemporary and intellectual and personal associate of Tycho Brahe who likewise is associated with the evolution of chemistry during the seventeenth century. Daniel Sennert, a professor at Wittenberg wrote in 1619 that most chemical physicians followed the lead of Severinus and even referred to a “Severinian School” of medical theory, which was based on the philosophy of Paracelsus. Scholars including Jole Shackelford and Hiro Hirai (Le concept de semences dans les théories de la matière à la Renaissance, 2005) have claimed that Severinus was an important predecessor of both Johann Baptista von Helmont and Pierre Gassendi.

== Early life ==
Peder Sørensen, later known by his Latinized name Petrus Severinus, was born in the Danish town of Ribe on the west coast of Jutland in either 1542 or 1540. Both years are cited in seventeenth century texts. Ribe was a flourishing town on a major trade route between the farmers of Jutland and their markets to the south. It was also a harbor town that supported regular trade with Holland, England, and other port towns of the Frisian coast. Ribe was also an administrative center with the cathedral at Ribe governed by one of the most important sees in sixteenth century Denmark.

Severinus’ parents were probably prosperous and well-positioned and like other sons of the well to do, Severinus probably enrolled in Ribe’s Latin or cathedral school before moving on to universities abroad or the university at Copenhagen. After the Reformation, the Catholic hierarchy was replaced with Lutheran masters and administrators, but the curriculum is unlikely to have changed much. The cathedral at Ribe was administered by some of the greatest humanist reformers in the sixteenth and seventeenth centuries, including Hans Tausen, Peder Hegelund, and Jens Dinesen Jersin providing Severinus with the best education available in Denmark at the time.

== Academic life ==
Some time around the late 1550s, Severinus entered the University of Copenhagen. While enrolled he probably followed the standard European undergraduate curriculum, which prescribed texts based on the writings and commentaries of Aristotle. Copenhagen as a reformed university allowed for the study of natural philosophy or “Phillippist” humanism named after Philipp Melanchthon. Philosophy at the University of Copenhagen comprised three branches: logic (grammar, dialectic, and rhetoric), physics (mathematics, physiology, and metaphysics), and ethics. Severinus’ first exposure to basic academic medicine probably came during his physiology and metaphysics classes, which were largely Aristotelian-based.

In 1562, Severinus left Copenhagen and headed to France to begin medical studies, but returned a year later due to a lack of funding. In 1563 King Frederick II offered Severinus a canonry position as a doctor in Viborg, which was probably used to fund a stipend for three years of medical studies. When and where Severinus ultimately earned his medical degree remains unclear. Severinus was promoted to the level of master in 1564 under the direction of Nicolaus Laurentius Scavenius, who held the chair in mathematics and later physics at the University of Copenhagen. These subjects covered the philosophical groundwork for medicine, including generation and corruption—themes Severinus would return to again and again throughout his life. It was in fact his theories on these subjects that earned him international acclaim. In 1571 Severinus was officially named the physician to King Frederick II until his death in 1588. He then attended to Christian IV who at the time was a minor. When Christian became fully vested as king in 1592, he hired additional physicians while still employing Severinus who retained his title and income. For the last ten years of his life, Severinus enjoyed relative freedom from official duties, yet failed to produce any additional writings since his influential work, Idea medicinæ philosophicæ in 1571.

== Severinus and Paracelsianism ==
Severinus very early in his career was drawn to the teachings and writing of the German medical reformer Theophrastus Paracelsus (1493–1541). Severinus’ Idea medicinæ philosophicae (1571) is his most important written work, which interprets the teachings of Paracelsus. Although Paracelsus’ writings are difficult to discern, his primary contribution to the study of medicine rests on his assertions that medicine could only be learned and improved through a study of nature grounded in Christian principles. Paracelsus also stressed a reliance on chemistry to prepare certain formularies for the treatment of disorders.

While a medical student, Severinus began to hear of the success of certain Paracelsian medicines and began to read Paracelsus’ writings. While these writings were rather obscure, Severinus persisted in understanding the concepts through his own empirical experiments and by applying the teachings of ancient Greeks in matters of theory and observation. Severinus increasingly found traditional Aristotelian and Galenic medical methods unsatisfactory and likewise began to embrace chemistry and the teachings of Paracelsus to create efficacious drugs. The compounds most often relied on were those with “strong manifest qualities” such as smell, which were believed to be an indication of their effectiveness. The toxicity of certain compounds would be addressed by applying chemical principles to negate the toxic qualities. The controversy with such a method, however, was that it was not always known whether a compound was toxic until it was ingested.

== The Idea medicinæ philosophicæ of Severinus ==
Severinus' best known writing is Idea medicinæ, published in Basel in 1571. The volume provides Severinus’ interpretation of the metaphysical and physical foundations of medicine and natural change. It is believed this is Severinus’ only work that fully illustrates his acceptance of Paracelsian writings. But it was deemed sufficiently important in the seventeenth century to produce two more editions and three extensive commentaries. Idea medicinæ focuses not only on medicine, but also ideological questions that impacted moral philosophy and religion. The book is essentially a philosophical discussion of the fundamental causes of change in natural bodies and calls into question the standard medical practices of the day which were based on Galenic medicine and the four humors of the body.

Severinus believed that diseases had an organic cause. He theorized that seeds of disease (semina morborum) are foreign matter in a healthy body and take root, grow, and disrupt the normally orderly process of bodily functions. These seeds manifest themselves in various places in the body and produce particular symptoms that identify the disease. In order to restore health, chemically derived remedies could be produced and administered in order to restore bodily harmony.

== Severinus’ Legacy ==
Readers of Severinus’ Idæ medicinæ were introduced to a new world of chemical philosophy. Although deeply rooted in Paracelsianism, Severinus’ deciphering of Paracelsus essentially shed light on writings that arguably may have remained enigmatic. Incorporating chemical ideas into therapeutic practice received wide attention, especially in Denmark where Tycho Brahe was also engaged in the chemical arts and whose royal favor and patronage further advanced the emerging science of chemistry. Thomas Erastus, Andreas Libavius and other anti-Paracelsianists however served to minimize Severinus’ legacy. Libavious in particular attacked the occult sciences of any variety but crusaded especially against Paracelsus and any writings that supported him, including Severinus. On the other hand, Idæ medicinæ’s impact on English natural philosophers can be discerned in the writings of Thomas Moffett (1553-1604), and Francis Bacon (1561-1626) who on the one hand vilified Paracelsus but admired the important synthesis contributed by Petrus Severinus.
