= Samuel Eisenmenger =

German physician, theologian and astronomer

Samuel Eisenmenger (28 September 1534 – 28 February 1585) was a German physician, theologian and astronomer. He was the Professor of Astronomy at the University of Tübingen from 1557 to 1568.

== Life ==
As the son of Johann Eisenmenger, pastor in Bretten, he attended the city school of his hometown. In 1551, he enrolled at the University of Wittenberg. Here he was, supported by Philipp Melanchthon, Baccalaureus, moved to the University of Heidelberg and the University of Tübingen, where he obtained a Master's degree on 21 January 1554. In 1557 he was appointed as successor to Philipp Imsser in the professorship of Mathematics and Astronomy at the University of Tübingen, together with Johann Scheubel.He then studied medicine and graduated in October 1564.

Eisenmenger was the personal physician of the Bishop of Speyer, the Margrave of Baden, the Archbishop of Cologne and the Bishop of Strasbourg.

Eisenmenger edited the work of Paracelsus and published works on the application of astrology in medicine.

== Works ==
- Ephemerides, 1561
- De methode iatromathematicae conjonctionis qua astrologiae fundamenta certissima indicantur, Strasbourg, 1563
- De usu partium coeli in commendationem astronomine, Strasbourg, 1563
- Cyclopaedia Paracelsica Christiana. Three books of this were the origin and tradition of the liberal arts, also of the physiognomy, above miracles and weather, Brussels, 1585 He then studied medicine and graduated in October 1564
- The prognostic and prophecy of the last ones from the MDLXIIII Jar to the MDCVII are drawn from the eclipses and the great ephemeris of the highly populated Cypriani Leovicii and from the Prognostico Samuelid Syderocratis, and put together, Basel, 1568
- Oratio de methodo iatromathematicae ... eam semper medias veteribus et recentibus usui necessario fuisse ... et astrologiae indicatur, Strasbourg, 1569
