= Eugène Bouchut =

French physician (1818–1891)

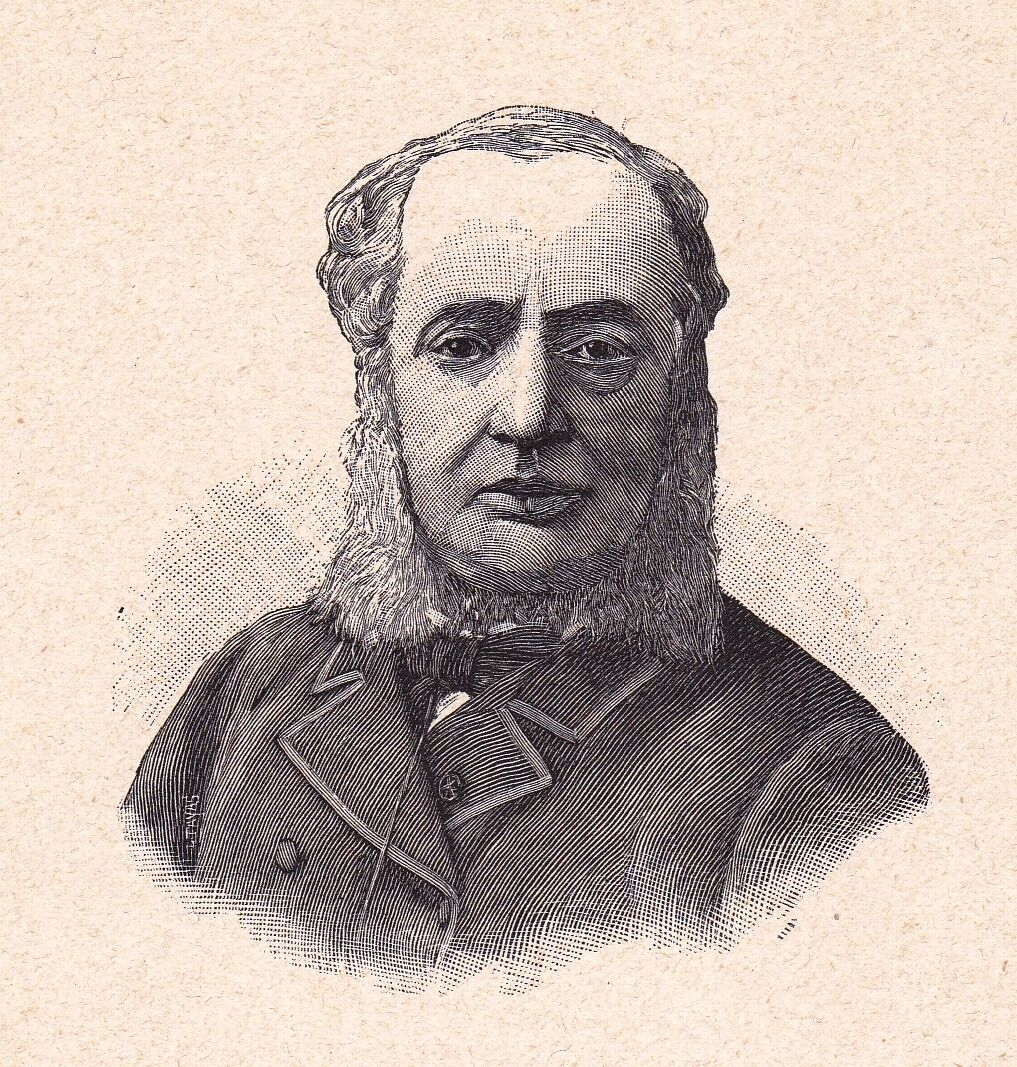
- Born: May 18, 1818
- Died: November 26, 1891 (aged 73)

Eugène Bouchut (French pronunciation: [øʒɛn buʃy]; 18 May 1818 – 26 November 1891) was a French physician born in Paris. He made significant contributions in several medical fields, including pediatrics, laryngology, neurology and ophthalmology.

== Career ==
Bouchut obtained his doctorate in medicine in Paris in 1843. Soon afterwards, he became Chef de clinique at the Hôtel-Dieu de Paris. In 1852, he became a member of the medical staff at the Hôpital Bon Secours, and later at the Hôpital Sainte-Eugenie and the Hôpital Necker-Enfants Malades. He taught at the École pratique des hautes études and Hôpital Sainte-Eugenie, and in 1857 and 1859 he substituted for André Duméril (1774–1860) at the Faculté de Médecine.

== Notable achievements ==
In 1858, Bouchut developed a new technique for non-surgical orotracheal intubation to bypass obstruction of the larynx resulting from a diphtheria-related pseudomembrane. His method involved introducing a small straight metal tube into the larynx, securing it by means of a silk thread and leaving it there for a few days until the pseudomembrane and airway obstruction had resolved sufficiently. Bouchut presented this experimental technique along with the results he had achieved in the first seven cases at the Académie des Sciences conference on 18 September 1858. The members of the Academy initially rejected Bouchut's ideas, largely as a result of highly critical and negative remarks made by the influential Armand Trousseau. Undaunted, Bouchut later introduced a set of tubes (Bouchut's tubes) for intubation of the trachea, as an alternative to tracheotomy in cases of diphtheria.

Bouchut was also among the first practitioners of "cerebroscopy" (now referred to as ophthalmoscopy), a technique used for examining the interior of the eye for diagnosis of brain disorders such as meningitis.

== Publications ==
Bouchut published a number of works on pediatrics, and was the author of an important book on acute and chronic neurasthenia titled De l'État nerveux aigu et chronique, ou nervosisme. He also published Traité des signes de la mort et des moyens de prévenir les enterrements prématurés, a treatise concerning the prevention of premature burials, which won an award from the Académie des sciences in 1846.

== See also ==
- History of tracheal intubation
