= Euricius Cordus =

German poet, physician and botanist

Euricius Cordus born Heinrich Ritze (1486 – 24 December 1535) was a German humanist poet, physician, botanist and naturalist. He is considered one of the founders of botany in Germany.

Cordus was born in Simtshausen near Marburg the youngest of thirteen children born to a miller. He was educated at Frankenberg / Eder as well as at Marburg. He became a teacher in Kassel from 1509 to 1511 and then as a rent clerk in Felsberg. He later went to Erfurt where he met Conrad Mutian. He received a master's degree in 1516 and became rector at the Saint Marien college. He moved to study medicine in 1519 and became a doctor in 1521 and practiced in Braunschweig. In 1527 he moved to the University of Marburg as a professor of medicine. He is thought to have set up a botanical garden, possibly the first in Germany, and conducted excursions with students to examine plants in nature. His book the Botanologicon (1534, 1551) is in the form of a dialogue between five people. Although an admirer he questioned the statements of Dioscorides and other ancients. He clashed with various people on his philosophies and eventually left his position in 1534. He then began to write poetry and epigrams. In his Liber de urinis (1543) he lampooned superstitious beliefs. His son Valerius Cordus (1515–1544) became a famous botanist and physician.

The standard author abbreviation E.Cordus is used to indicate this person as the author when citing a botanical name.
