= 1518 in science =

The year 1518 in science and technology included many events, some of which are listed here.

== Astronomy ==
- May 26 – A Transit of Venus occurs.

== Exploration ==
- May 1 – Juan de Grijalva arrives at the Tabasco region of Mexico.
- Martín Fernández de Enciso publishes his Suma de Geographia in Castile, a summary of world geography incorporating the latest discoveries in the New World.

== Mathematics ==
- Henricus Grammateus publishes Ayn neu Kunstlich Buech in Vienna, containing the earliest printed use of plus and minus signs for arithmetic. He also publishes Libellus de compositione regularum pro vasorum mensuratione. Deque arte ista tota theoreticae et practicae and a new musical temperament.
- Adam Ries publishes Rechnung auff der linihen, describing the use of a calculating board, a kind of two-dimensional abacus, for practical arithmetic.

== Medicine ==
- July – dancing plague, a case of dancing mania, breaks out in Strasbourg.
- September 23 – College of Physicians founded in London.
- Jacopo Berengario da Carpi publishes Tractatus de Fractura Calve sive Cranii in Bologna, the first monograph on neurosurgery.
- Publication of Antonio de Nebrija's Lexicon artis medicamentariae, "which contains the correspondence in vulgar language of the Greek and Latin names of the plants".

== Births ==
- July 3 - Li Shizhen, Chinese physician, pharmacologist and mineralogist (died 1593)
