= Valerius Cordus =

German physician, botanist, and author (1515–1544)

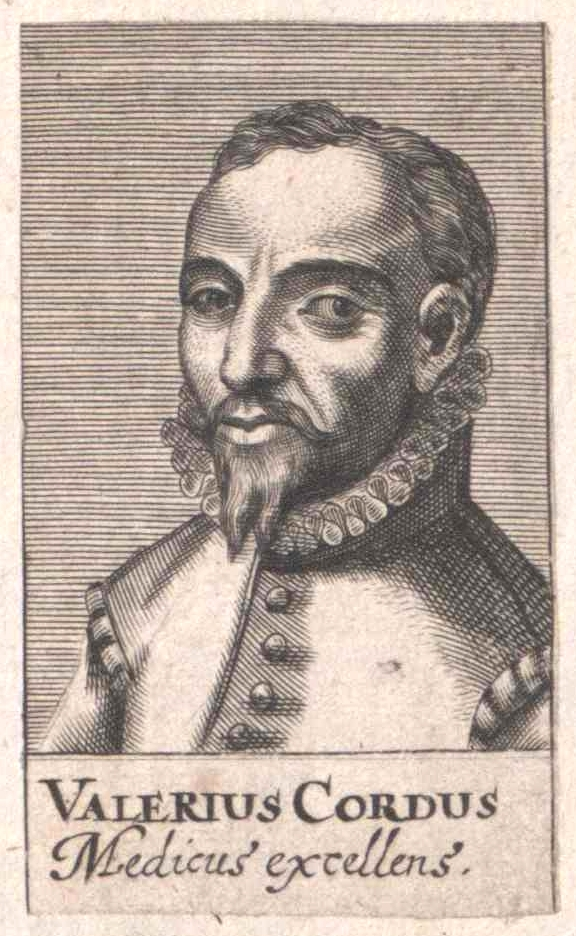
- German physician and botanist
- Born: 18 February 1515; Hesse or Erfurt, Holy Roman Empire
- Died: 25 September 1544 (aged 29); Rome, Papal States

Valerius Cordus (18 February 1515 – 25 September 1544) was a German physician, botanist and pharmacologist who authored the first pharmacopoeia North of the Alps and one of the most celebrated herbals in history. He is also widely credited with developing the sulfuric acid method for synthesizing ether (which he called by the Latin name oleum dulce vitrioli, or "sweet oil of vitriol").

Cordus wrote prolifically, and identified and described several new plant species and varieties. The plant genus Cordia is named for him.

== Life ==
In 1515, Valerius Cordus was born either in the city of Erfurt in what is today Thuringia, or somewhere in the westwardly adjacent state of Hesse. His father, Euricius Cordus (born Heinrich Ritze, 1486–1535), was an educated physician and an ardent Lutheran convert.

Valerius began his higher education in 1527, at the young age of 12, when he enrolled at the University of Marburg, studying botany and pharmacy under the tutelage of his father, who had been appointed professor of medicine at the newly established university in the same year. He completed his bachelor's degree in 1531, whereupon he furthered his studies by enrolling at the University of Leipzig, and by working at an apothecary shop in Leipzig owned by his uncle (either Johannes or Joachim).

In 1539 he relocated to Wittenberg in order to lecture and study medicine at the University of Wittenberg. His lectures proved popular, and his students' lecture notes were published posthumously in 1549 as Annotations on Dioscorides. Among the research outlined in the lectures were the results of his own systematic observations of many of the same plants described by Pedanius Dioscorides in the 1st century CE. Direct observation of live specimens was one of Cordus' strengths.

In 1540 Cordus discovered and described a revolutionary technique for synthesizing ether, which involved adding sulfuric acid to ethyl alcohol.

In 1543, while on his way for a long trip in Italy, he presented his pharmacopoeia, Dispensatorium, to the Nuremberg city council. The council paid him 100 gold guilders following the acceptance of the work in October of the same year, and had the work published posthumously in 1546.

In October 1543, Cordus left Nuremberg for Italy. He stayed in Padua and Venice during the winter and next spring. Shortly after Pentecost, he and two German naturalists started to traverse Italy, continuing in the height of summer. In the Maremma, on the Italian westcoast, they ventured into the marshes in search of novel plants. Soon after, Cordus exhibited what may have been the symptoms of malaria. He was also hit on the leg by a horse, causing great pain, and possibly an infection. The party brought the feverish Cordus to Rome, where they arrived on September 1 or 2. When Cordus showed signs of improvement, the rest embarked on a trip to Naples. Cordus, aged 29, died in their absence, on the evening of September 25. He was interred at Santa Maria dell'Anima, the German Catholic church in central Rome.

== Legacy ==
Throughout his short life, Cordus travelled extensively, visited many universities, and was widely acclaimed by his colleagues and other associates. He was an impressive linguist, and also spoke eloquently on philosophy. As a botanist, he observed with a breadth and depth that surpassed most of his contemporaries; as a scientist, his methodology was systematic and thorough.

After the death of Cordus, Conrad Gessner published a considerable amount of Cordus' remaining unpublished work, including De Extractione (which featured Cordus' ether synthesis method), Historia stirpium and Sylva in 1561.

The standard author abbreviation V.Cordus is used to indicate this person as the author when citing a botanical name.

== Works ==
- Dispensatorium pharmacorum omnium, quae in usu potissimum sunt (1546)
- Sylva rerum fossilium in Germania, plurimarum metallorum, lapidum, stirpium aliquot rariorum (1549)
- De artificiosis extractionibus libri (1549)
- Compositiones medicinales aliquot non vulgares (1549)
- Annotationes in Pedacii Dioscoridis (1561)
- Stirpium descriptionis liber quintus (1563)
- De halosantho seu spermate Ceti vulgo dicti (1566)
