= 1529 in science =

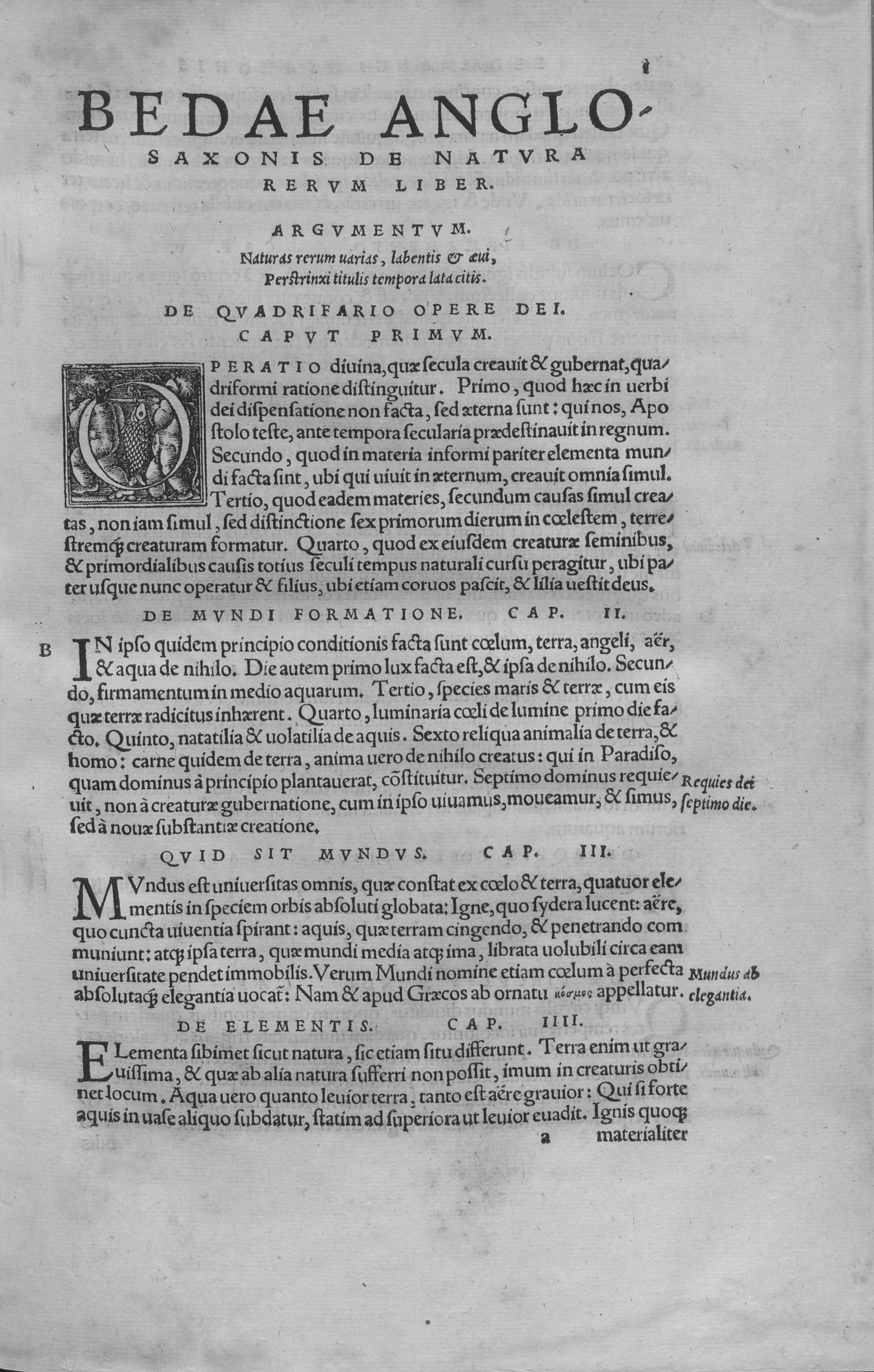
Page from a 1529 edition of Bede’s De natura rerum, printed in Basel.

The year 1529 in science and technology included a number of events, some of which are listed here.

== Astronomy ==
- Petrus Apianus publishes Introductio Cosmographiae, cum quibusdam Geometriae ac Astronomiae principiis eam necessariis ad rem in Ingolstadt.

== Chemistry ==
- Fluorine is first described by Georgius Agricola.
- The alchemical text Kunst- und recht Alchämei-Büchlein is published in Worms.

== Technology ==
- Michelangelo is appointed to reconstruct the fortifications of Florence.

== Births ==
- April 3 – Michael Neander, German mathematician (died 1581)
- April 25 – Franciscus Patricius (born Franjo Petriš), Venetian philosopher and scientist of Croatian descent (died 1597)
- December 16 – Laurent Joubert, French physician (died 1582)
- 1529 or 1530 – Julius Caesar Aranzi, Bolognese anatomist (died 1589)

== Deaths ==
- Hans von Gersdorff, German surgeon (born c.1455)
