= 1524 in science =

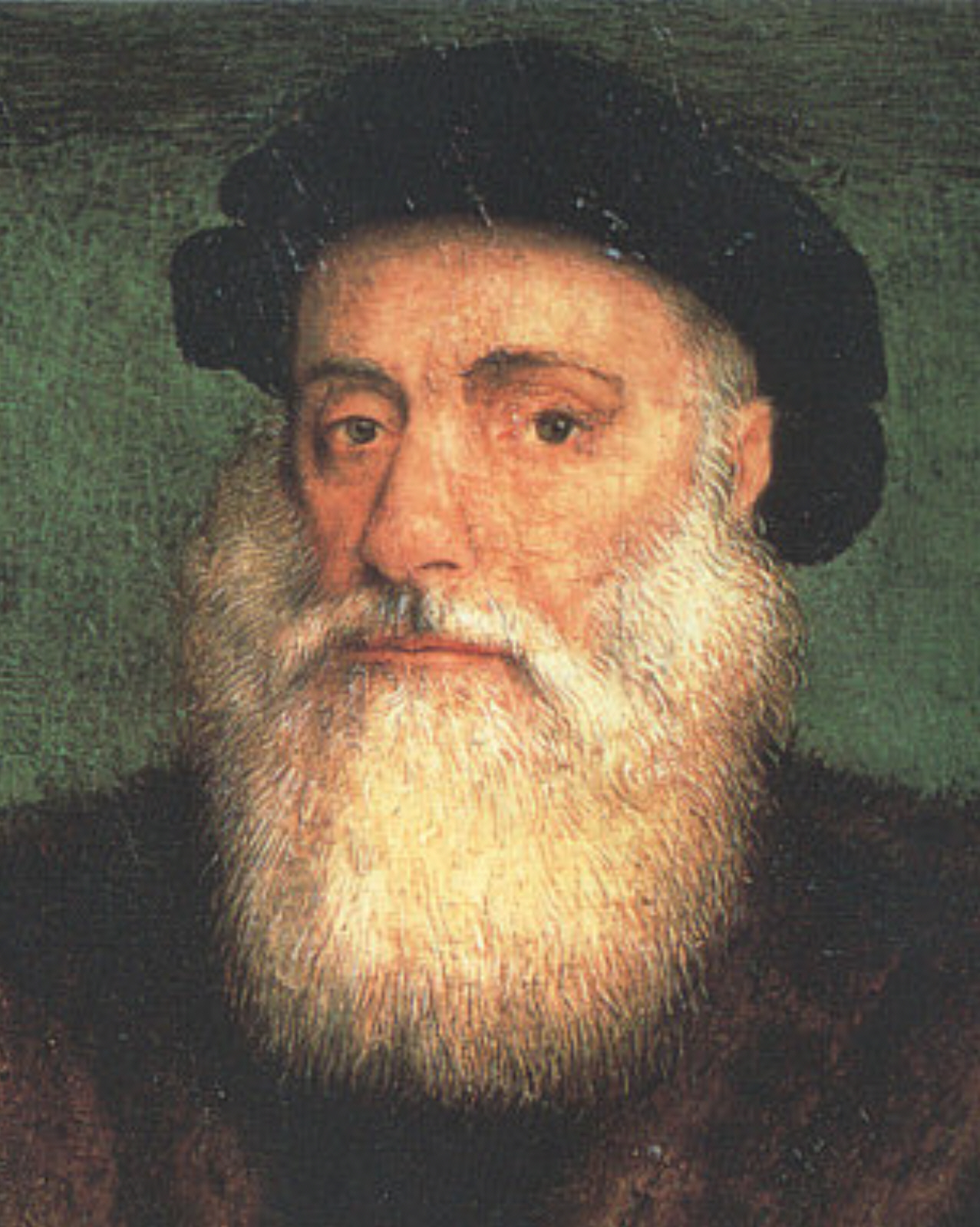
Vasco da Gama, Portuguese navigator died on December 24th, 1524

The year 1524 in science and technology included a number of events, some of which are listed here.

== Exploration and geography ==
- January 17 – Florentine explorer Giovanni da Verrazzano, on board La Dauphine in the service of Francis I of France, sets out from Madeira for the New World to seek out a westabout sea route to the Pacific Ocean.
- March 1 (approximate date) – da Verrazzano's expedition makes landfall at Cape Fear.
- April 17 – da Verrazzano's expedition makes the first European entry into New York Bay.
- July 8 – da Verrazzano's expedition returns to Dieppe.
- Petrus Apianus publishes Cosmographicus liber in Landshut, a popular textbook on navigation.

== Mathematics ==
- Adam Ries publishes his algebraic text Coß.

== Births ==
- September 7 – Thomas Erastus, Swiss physician and theologian (died 1583)
- probable date – Thomas Tusser, English chorister and agriculturalist (died 1580)

== Deaths ==
- August 28 – Fazio Cardano, Italian mathematician (born 1444)
- December 20 – Thomas Linacre, English physician (born 1460)
- December 24 – Vasco da Gama, Portuguese navigator (born c. 1469)
