= 1526 in science =

The year 1526 in science and technology included many events, some of which are listed here.

== Events ==
- Publication of Peter Treveris's The Grete Herball (a translation of Le Grant Herbier) in England.
- May 23 – Transit of Venus occurs
- December 5 – Paracelsus joins the Zur Lutzerne guild of Strasbourg.

== Births ==
- February 19 – Carolus Clusius, Flemish botanist (died 1609)
- Taqi al-Din Muhammad ibn Ma'ruf, Arab astronomer and inventor (died c. 1585)

== Deaths ==
- Eucharius Rösslin, German obstetrician (born c. 1470)
