= 1523 in science =

The year 1523 in science and technology included many events, some of which are listed here.

== Natural history ==
- The park at Colditz Castle in Saxony is converted into one of the largest menageries in Europe, and the first in Germany.

== Publications ==
- Pietro Aron publishes Thoscanello de la musica in Venice, including the first description of quarter-comma meantone.
- Anthony Fitzherbert publishes The Boke of Surveyinge and Improvements and The Boke of Husbandrie, the first work on agriculture published in England.
- Thomas Linacre publishes his translation of Galen's De naturalibus facultatibus in London.
- Maximilianus Transylvanus publishes De Moluccis Insulis, the first account of the Magellan circumnavigation.

== Births ==
- Gabriele Falloppio, Italian anatomist and physician (died 1562)
