= 1553 in science =

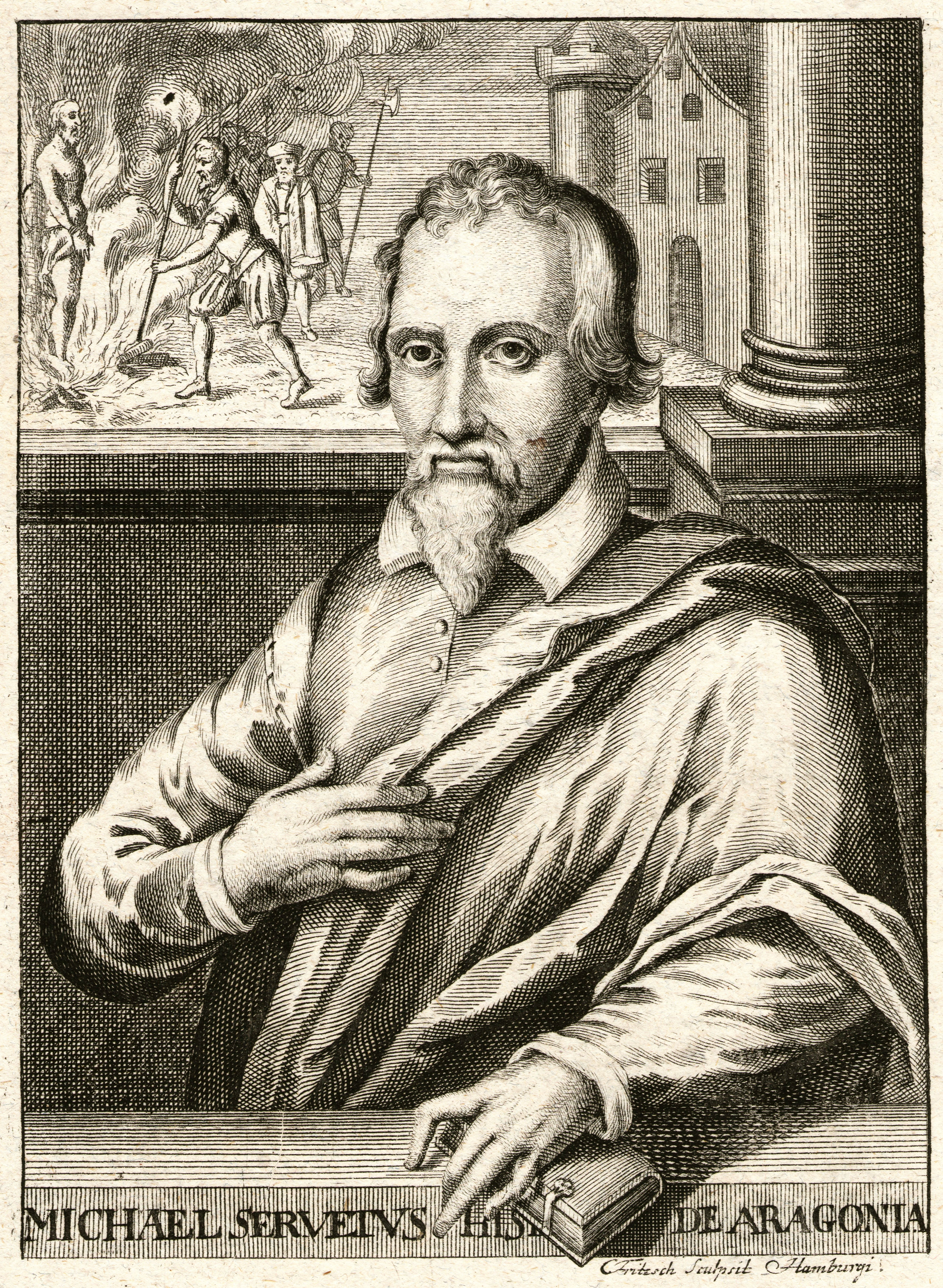
Miguel Servet, Miguel de Villanueva (1511 - 1553

The year 1553 CE in science and technology included a number of events, some of which are listed here.

== Astronomy ==
- Leonard Digges publishes his popular English language ephemeris, A General Prognostication.

== Cryptography ==
- 'Vigenère cipher' first described by Giovan Battista Bellaso in his book La cifra del. Sig. Giovan Battista Bellaso (Venice).

== Exploration ==
- May 10 – Sir Hugh Willoughby and Richard Chancellor set out from the River Thames to seek the Northeast Passage.
  - August 14 – Willoughby sights what is probably Novaya Zemlya.
  - August – Chancellor enters the White Sea and reaches Arkhangelsk.
- Naturalist Pierre Belon publishes Les observations de plusieurs singularitez et choses memorables trouvées en Grèce, Asie, Judée, Egypte, Arabie et autres pays étrangèrs (Paris).
- Conquistador Pedro Cieza de León publishes the Primera Parte of his Crónicas del Perú.

== Physics ==
- Venetian mathematician Giambattista Benedetti publishes Resolutio omnium Euclidis problematum, proposing a new doctrine of the speed of bodies in free fall.

== Physiology and medicine ==
- Michael Servetus publishes Christianismi Restitutio, including an account of the circulation of the blood.
- Publication in Spain of Libro del Exercicio, considered the first book on the benefits of physical exercise for health.

== Births ==
- November 23 – Prospero Alpini, Italian physician and botanist (d. 1617)
- Robert Hues, English mathematician and geographer (d. 1632)
- Thomas Muffet, English naturalist and physician (d. 1604)
- Luca Valerio, Italian mathematician (d. 1618)

== Deaths ==
- February 19 – Erasmus Reinhold, German astronomer and mathematician (b. 1511)
- August 8 – Girolamo Fracastoro, Italian physician (b. 1478)
- October 27 – Michael Servetus, Aragonese polymath (b. 1511) (executed for heresy)
- Pierre Desceliers, French cartographer and hydrographer (born c. 1500)
