= 1534 in science =

The year 1534 in science and technology included a number of events, some of which are listed here.

== Astronomy ==
- Oronce Finé publishes Quadrans astrolabicus in Paris.

== Exploration ==
- April 20 – September 5 – Expedition of Jacques Cartier to the Gulf of Saint Lawrence.
  - May 10 – Cartier reaches Newfoundland.
  - June 9 – Cartier is the first European to discover the Saint Lawrence River.

== Mathematics ==
- Petrus Apianus publishes Primi Mobilis Instrumentum in Nuremberg, on trigonometry and containing tables of sines.

== Medicine ==
- Girolamo Fracastoro publishes Di Vini Temperatura.
- Stefan Falimierz publishes On Herbs and Their Potency (O ziolach y o moczy gich).

== Births ==
- September 28 − Samuel Eisenmenger, German physician and mathematician (died 1585)
- November 6 – Joachim Camerarius the Younger, German physician and botanist (died 1598)
- undated − Volcher Coiter, Dutch anatomist (died 1576)

== Deaths ==
- December 13 − Paul of Middelburg, Flemish scientist and bishop (born 1446)
- December 23 – Otto Brunfels, German botanist (born c. 1488)
