= 1532 in science =

The year 1532 in science and technology included a number of events, some of which are listed here.

== Astronomy ==
- Petrus Apianus publishes at Ingolstadt Ein Bericht der Kurtzer Observation unnd urtels des Jűngst erschinnen Cometen (on his observations of comets) and Quadrans astronomicus Apiani (on the astronomical quadrant).

== Botany ==
- Otto Brunfels publishes a book of herbs.
- Sugar cane first cultivated in Brazil.
- Gherardo Cibo begins his herbarium, the oldest still surviving.

== Geography ==
- Jacob Ziegler publishes his principal geographical treatise, Quae intus continentur Syria, Palestina, Arabia, Aegyptus, Schondia, Holmiae... at Strasbourg.

== Births ==
- John Hawkins, English navigator (died 1595)
- Pedro Sarmiento de Gamboa, Spanish explorer and scientist (died 1592)

== Deaths ==
- Diego de Ordaz, Spanish explorer (born 1480)
