= 1552 in science =

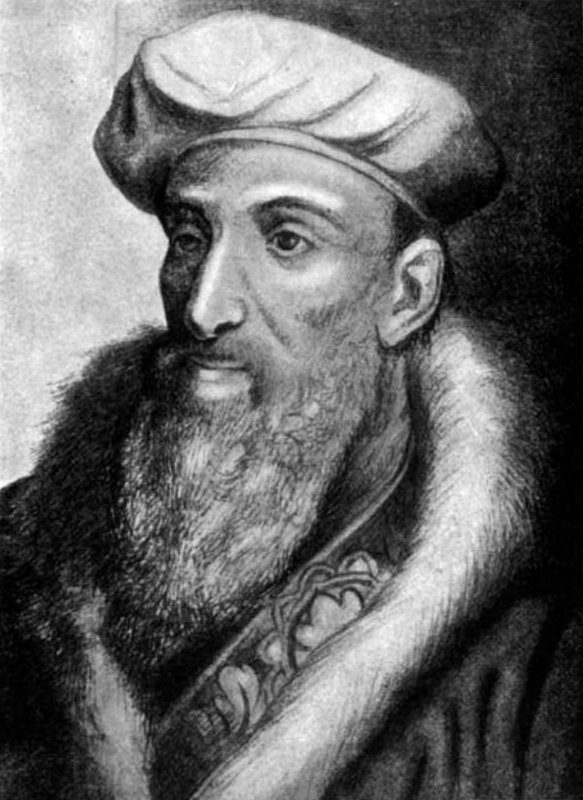
Portrait of Bartolomeus Eustachius, the anatomist.

== Life sciences ==
- In Italy, Bartolomeo Eustachi completes his Tabulae anatomicae, presenting his discoveries on the structure of the inner ear (including the Eustachian tube) and heart, although it will not be published until 1714.
- Cornelius Gemma publishes the first illustration of a human tapeworm.
- Thierry de Héry publishes La Méthode Curatoire de la maladie vénérienne vulgairement appelée grosse Vérole et de la diversité de ses symptômes, the first work in French on syphilis.
- Ambroise Paré appointed royal surgeon to the House of Valois in France; and begins publication of a treatise on battlefield medicine, La Manière de traicter les playes faictes tant par hacquebutes que par flèches et les accidentz d'icelles.
- Edward Wotton's systematic researches in zoology are collected in De differentiis animalium libri decem, published in Paris.
- The Libellus de Medicinalibus Indorum Herbis ("Little Book of the Medicinal Herbs of the Indians") is composed in Nahuatl by Martín de la Cruz and translated into Latin by Juan Badiano at the Real Colegio de Santa Cruz in Tlatelolco (Mexico).

== Births ==
- February 28 – Jost Bürgi, Swiss clockmaker and mathematician (died 1632)
- Petrus Plancius, Flemish cartographer and cosmographer (died 1622)

== Deaths ==
- April 21 – Petrus Apianus, German cartographer and cosmographer (born 1495)
- May 18 – Theodor Dorsten, German botanist and physician (born 1492)
- May 26 – Sebastian Münster, German cartographer and cosmographer (born 1488)
- Bartolomeo Maggi, Bolognese surgeon, (born 1477)
