= 1536 in science =

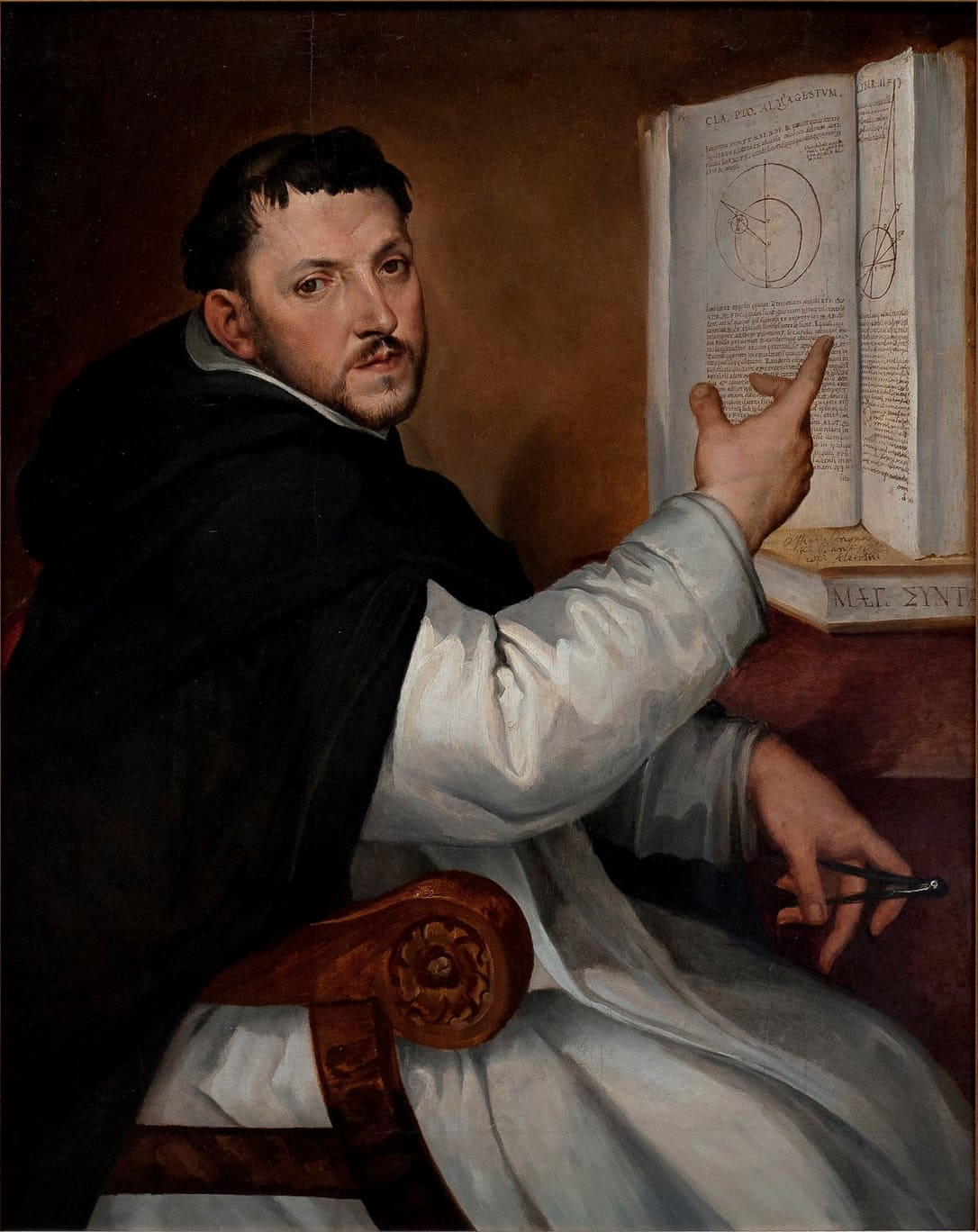
Ignazio Danti, Italian mathematician and astronomer

The year 1536 in science and technology included a number of events, some of which are listed here.

== Botany ==
- Charles Estienne publishes Seminarium, et Plantarium fructiferarum praesertim arborum quae post hortos conseri solent, Denuo auctum & locupletatum. Huic accessit alter libellus de conserendis arboribus in seminario: deque iis in plantarium transserendis atque inserendis in Paris.
- Jean Ruelle publishes De Natura stirpium libri tres in Paris, the first general descriptive botany to be printed.

== Exploration ==
- July 15 – Jacques Cartier's expedition returns to Saint-Malo.
- End of Álvar Núñez Cabeza de Vaca's expedition in the Americas.

== Mathematics ==
- Adam Ries publishes his book of tables for calculating everyday prices Ein Gerechent Büchlein auff den Schöffel Eimer vnd Pfundtgewicht...

== Physiology and medicine ==
- German physician Johann Dryander (Eichmann) publishes Anatomia capitis humani in Marburg, the first book on the anatomy of the human head.
- Charles Estienne publishes De vasculis libellus, adulescentulorum causa ex Baysio decerptus. Addita vulgari Latinarum vocum interpretatione in Paris and De re vestiaria libellus, ex Bayfio excerptus: addita vulgaris linguae interpretatione, in adulescentulorum gratiam atque utilitatem in Lyon.
- Paracelsus publishes his work on surgery, Die grosse Wundartzney, in Ulm.
- Sir Thomas Elyot publishes his popular medical text, The Castel of Helth, in London.

== Births ==
- April – Ignazio Danti, Italian mathematician and astronomer (died 1586).
- October 28 – Felix Plater, Swiss physician (died 1614).
- Juan de Fuca, Greek navigator (died 1602).
- Henri de Monantheuil, French mathematician and physician (died 1606).
- Roger Marbeck, English royal physician (died 1605).
- approx. date – Juan Fernández, Spanish explorer (died c. 1604).

== Deaths ==
- Baldassare Peruzzi, Sienese architect (born 1481).
