= 1539 in science =

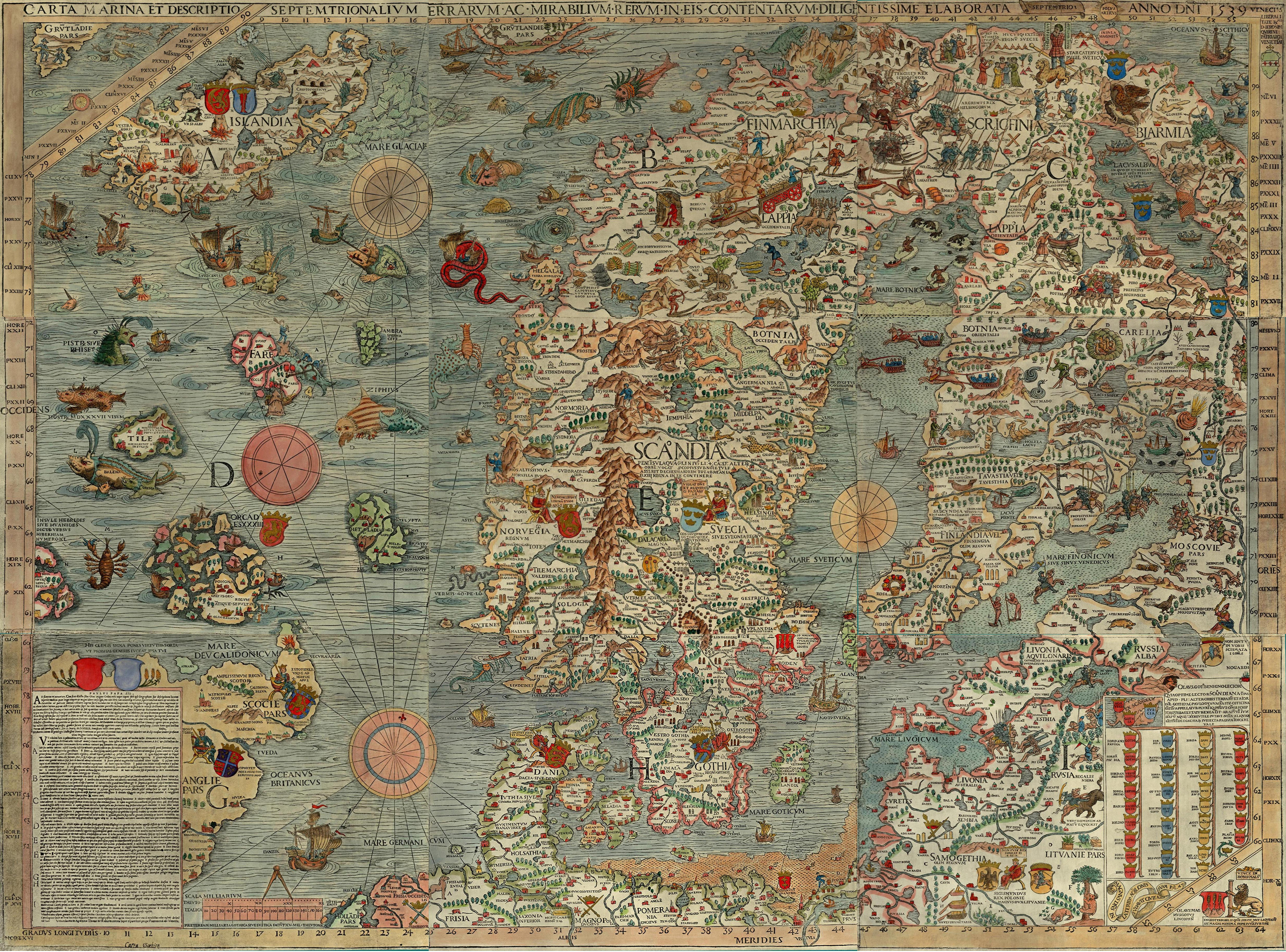
“Marine map and Description of the Northern Lands and of their Marvels, most carefully drawn up at Venice in the year 1539 through the generous assistance of the Most Honourable Lord Hieronymo Quirino.”

The year 1539 in science and technology included many events, some of which are listed here.

== Botany ==
- Hieronymus Bock publishes the first edition of his flora of Germany, the Kreutterbuch, adopting a new system of classification based on his observations.

== Cartography ==
- Olaus Magnus publishes his Carta marina in Italy, the first detailed map of Scandinavia.

== Exploration ==
- May 30 – Hernando de Soto lands at Tampa Bay, Florida.
- August–September – Francisco de Ulloa explores the Gulf of California.

== Medicine ==
- Johannes Baptista Montanus is appointed professor of medicine at the University of Padua where he introduces clinical medicine, including bedside examination, into the curriculum, integrating theory and practice.

== Births ==
- September/October – José de Acosta, naturalist (died 1600)
- exact date unknown – Olivier de Serres, soil scientist (died 1619)

== Deaths ==
- August – Vannoccio Biringuccio, Italian metallurgist (born 1480)
