= 1538 in science =

The year 1538 in science and technology included a number of events, some of which are listed here.

== Botany ==
- William Turner's Libellus de re herbaria novus, the first essay on scientific botany in English, is published in London.

== Earth sciences ==
- September 29–October 6 – The last significant volcanic eruption in the Phlegraean Fields of Italy creates Monte Nuovo.

== Births ==
- March 25 – Christopher Clavius, German mathematician and astronomer (died 1612)
- Matthias de l'Obel, Flemish-born physician and botanist (died 1616)

== Deaths ==
- May 27 – Sir Anthony Fitzherbert, English judge and agriculturalist (born 1470)
- Federico Crisogono, Italian scientist (born 1472)
