= 1549 in science =

The year 1549 in science and technology included some events, a few of which are listed here.

== Births ==
- November 30 – Henry Savile, English polymath and benefactor (died 1622)
- Michiel Coignet, Flemish engineer, cosmographer, mathematician and scientific instrument-maker (died 1623)
- Nikola Vitov Gučetić, Ragusan polymath (died 1610)

== Deaths ==
- April – Andrew Boorde, English physician and traveller (born 1490)
- August – Jacob Ziegler, German geographer (born c. 1470/1)
