= 1537 in science =

The year 1537 in science and technology included many events, some of which are listed here.

== Mathematics ==
- Niccolò Fontana Tartaglia publishes La Nova Scientia in Venice, applying mathematics to the study of ballistics.
- Pedro Nunes publishes several treatises on navigation: Tratado em defensam da carta de marear, Tratado sobre certas dúvidas da navegação (including discussion of a rhumb line course) and Tratado da sphera com a Theorica do Sol e da Lua.
- The first known complete English language arithmetic book, An Introduction for to Lerne to Recken with the Pen and with the Counters after the True Cast of Arsmetyke or Awgrym, an anonymous translation of Luca Pacioli's Summa de arithmetica, geometria, proportioni et proportionalità (Venice, 1494), is published at St Albans.
