= Exoticorum libri decem =

1605 book by Carolus Clusius

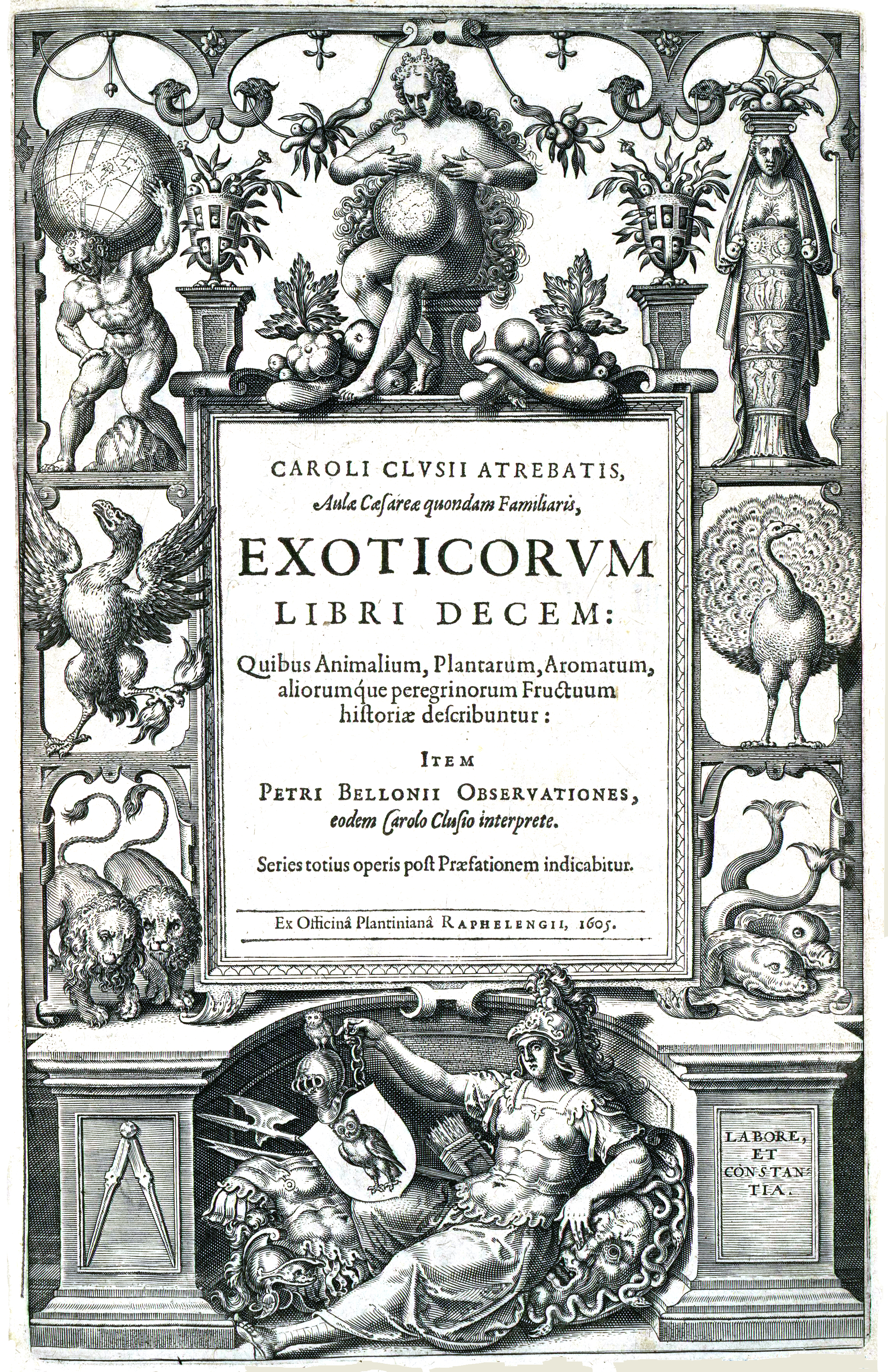

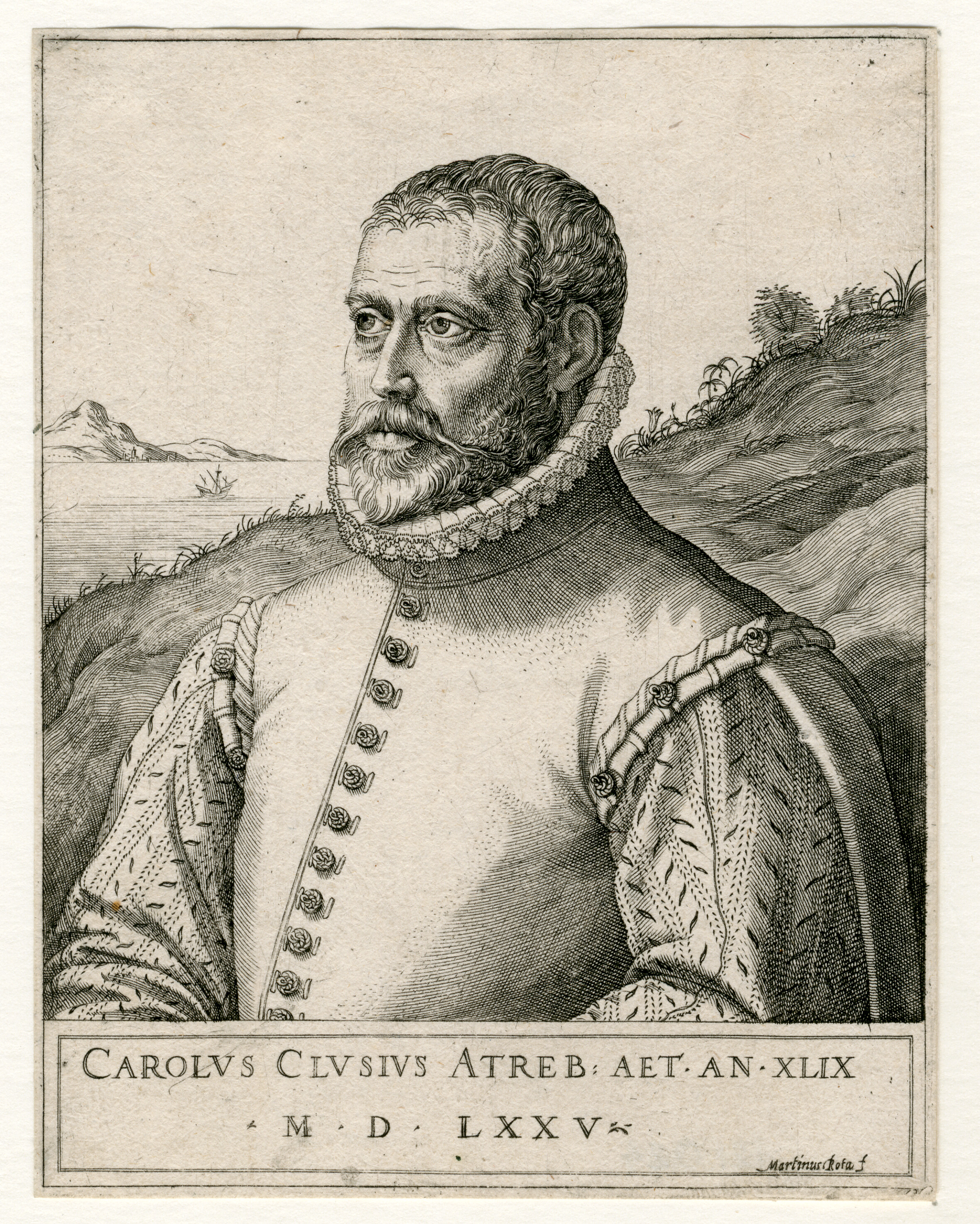
Carolus Clusius at 49 years of age

Exoticorum libri decem ("Ten books of exotic life forms") is an illustrated zoological and botanical compendium in Latin, published at Leiden in 1605 by Charles de l'Écluse.

On the title page the author's name appears in its well-known Latin form Carolus Clusius. The full title is: Exoticorum libri decem, quibus animalium, plantarum, aromatum, aliorumque peregrinorum fructuum historiae describuntur ("Ten books of exotica: the history and uses of animals, plants, aromatics and other natural products from distant lands").

Clusius was not only an original biologist but also a remarkable linguist. He became well known as a translator and editor of the works of others. Exoticorum libri decem consists partly of his own discoveries, partly of translated and edited versions of earlier publications, always properly acknowledged, and with many new illustrations. Separately identifiable within this compendium can be found Clusius's Latin translations, with his own notes, from:

- Garcia de Orta, Colóquios dos simples e drogas he cousas medicinais da Índia (1563)
- Nicolás Monardes, Historia medicinal de las cosas que se traen de nuestras Indias Occidentales (1565–1574)
- Cristóbal Acosta, Tractado de las drogas y medicinas de las Indias orientales (1578)

There is also material by Prospero Alpini (Prosper Alpinus) with notes by Clusius. As a separately paginated appendix appears Clusius's Latin translation (first published in 1589) of:

- Pierre Belon, Observations (1553)

== Bibliography ==
- Dalby, Andrew (2000), Dangerous Tastes: the story of spices, London: British Museum Press, ISBN 0-7141-2720-5, p. 160.
