= Historia medicinal de las cosas que se traen de nuestras Indias Occidentales =

1565 survey by Nicolás Monardes

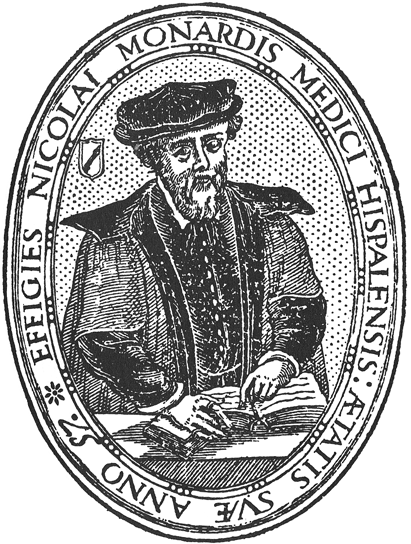
Nicolas Monardes at the age of 57, from the title page of the 1569 edition

Historia medicinal de las cosas que se traen de nuestras Indias Occidentales ("Medical study of the products imported from our West Indian possessions") is the standard title for a survey by Nicolás Monardes (1493–1588), Spanish physician and botanist. It appeared in successive editions under varying titles, gradually enlarged, in 1565, 1569 and 1574, followed by an unchanged reprint in 1580.

== Publication details ==
The full titles and publication details are:

- 1565: Dos libros ...
- 1569: Dos libros, el uno que trata de todas las cosas que se traen de nuestras Indias Occidentales, que sirven al uso de la medicina, y el otro que trata de la piedra bezaar, y de la yerva escuerçonera. Sevilla: Hernando Diaz
- 1574: Primera y segunda y tercera partes de la historia medicinal de las cosas que se traen de nuestras Indias Occidentales, que sirven en medicina; Tratado de la piedra bezaar, y dela yerva escuerçonera; Dialogo de las grandezas del hierro, y de sus virtudes medicinales; Tratado de la nieve, y del beuer frio. Sevilla: Alonso Escrivano
- 1580: Reprint of the 1574 publication. Sevilla: Fernando Diaz

== English translation ==
An English translation, by John Frampton, appeared under the title Joyful News out of the New Found World. Publication details:

- 1577: Ioyfull newes out of the newe founde worlde, wherein is declared the rare and singular vertues of diuerse and sundrie hearbes, trees, oyles, plantes, and stones, with their applications, as well for phisicke as chirurgerie, translated from the 1565 Spanish edition. London
- 1580: a new edition enlarged on the basis of the 1574 Spanish edition. London
- 1925: Joyfull newes out of the newe founde worlde (cover title: Frampton's Monardes), edited by Stephen Gaselee, combining material from the 1577 and 1580 editions. London

== Latin translation ==
A Latin translation, abridged, with editorial commentary, was made by Charles de l'Écluse (Carolus Clusius). Publication details:

- 1574: De simplicibus medicamentis ex occidentali India delatis quorum in medicina usus est. Antwerp: Plantin
- 1579: Simplicium medicamentorum ex novo orbe delatorum, quorum in medicina usus est, historia: revised with further commentary. Antwerp: Plantin
- 1582: Revised and included in a compendium of translations from Garcia de Orta, Nicolás Monardes and Cristóbal Acosta
- 1593: Further revised edition of this compendium
- 1605: Last revision, with further commentary and illustrations, included in: Carolus Clusius, Exoticorum libri decem
