= Stephen Gaselee (diplomat) =

British diplomat, writer, and librarian

Sir Stephen Gaselee KCMG CBE (9 November 1882 – 1943) was a British diplomat, writer, and librarian.

== Biography ==
Gaselee was born at Brunswick Gardens, Kensington, London, the eldest son of Henry Gaselee, a fellow of King's College, Cambridge, and his wife, Alice Esther (née Frost). His great grandfather was Sir Stephen Gaselee, a justice of the Court of Common Pleas.

He attended Temple Grove School in East Sheen. In 1896, he entered Eton College, where he was elected a King's scholar and edited the Eton College Chronicle. In 1901, he entered King's College, Cambridge University. In 1904, he earned a first class in part 1 of the classical tripos and, in 1905, a second class in part 2. In 1905, he left university to become tutor to Prince Leopold of Battenberg (later Lord Leopold Mountbatten), a grandson of Queen Victoria, and travelled widely. In 1907, he resumed his studies at Cambridge, where he was an editor of the Cambridge Review.

In 1908, he became the Pepys Librarian at Magdalene College, Cambridge. In 1909, he was elected a fellow and held the fellowship for 34 years. From 1916 to 1919, he worked with the Foreign Office. He returned to Cambridge after the war. But, in 1920, he was made librarian and Keeper of the Papers at the Foreign Office, a post he held till his death. He was president of The Bibliographical Society from 1932 to 1934.

In 1935 he held the Sandars Readership in Bibliography at speaking on "Bibliography and the Classics"

Gaselee's recreations, according to the anonymous obituary in The Times, were "travel, shooting and bridge," but he was a man of wide interests for whom work and recreation blended imperceptibly. He wrote on "classical literature, medieval and modern Latin ... Coptic, hagiography and liturgiology, palaeography and bibliography, Spain, Portugal, Madeira, wine and food".

His friend Ronald Storrs characterised him during their undergraduate days as follows:

Stephen Gaselee was already at the age of twenty what he never ceased to be, a Cambridge Personality; Gaselee, with almost as many friends as interests, a first-class classical scholar, a bibliophile, a bibliographer, a liturgiologist; Gaselee, who when playing tennis wore his hair in a net; who kept Siamese cats, fed with a revolting portion of cow’s lung preserved on a plate above his bookshelf; who had a fire every day in the year because England has a cold climate; who founded the Deipnosophists’ dining club, where the members, robed in purple dinner-jackets lined with lilac silk and preluding dashingly on Vodka, would launch forth into an uncharted ocean of good food and even better talk; Gaselee, who read, wrote and spoke Ancient Coptic (which the Copts themselves had not done for 300 years); Gaselee, nightly puffing his long churchwarden whilst he expatiated on Petronius, vestments, Shark’s Fin and cooking problems; a lay Prince of the Church, Ecclesiastic Militant and Gastronomer Royal.

He was a frequent and generous donor of books to Cambridge University Library. One unusual item was acquired at Sinaia in 1926: a copy, signed to Gaselee, of Queen Marie of Romania's novel Why? A story of great longing. His major donations were a collection of 311 incunabula, given in 1934; 279 early 16th century books, given in 1940; and fifty books to be chosen by the Librarian at his death. A group of benefactors bought his personal collection of works relating to Petronius and the Satyricon from his heirs and gave it to Cambridge University Library.

== Honours ==
He was appointed a Commander of the Order of the British Empire in the 1918 New Year Honours for his efforts during the First World War, when he worked in the Foreign Office Department of Information. He was appointed a Knight Commander of the Order of St Michael and St George in 1935.

== Works by Stephen Gaselee ==
- 1910: Petronius, Satyricon in Latin and English. Edited by Gaselee, with 100 illustrations by Norman Lindsay
- 1917: Achilles Tatius, Leucippe and Clitophon edited with English translation by Gaselee (Loeb Classical Library)
- 1921: The Spanish Books in the Library of Samuel Pepys. (Oxford University Press for the Bibliographical Society.)
- 1924: The Uniats and Their Rites, digitised by Richard Mammana for Project Canterbury
- 1925: Joyfull newes out of the newe founde worlde (cover title: Frampton's Monardes) edited by Gaselee, combining material from Frampton's 1577 and 1580 editions
- 1925: An Anthology of Medieval Latin, Macmillan and Company
- 1928: The Oxford Book of Medieval Latin Verse, edited by Gaselee

== Bibliography ==
- Andrew Dalby, "Gaseleiana" in Libraries Information Bulletin (Cambridge) no. 81 (1979) pp. 2–4.
- Robert Scoble, The Corvo Cult: The History of an Obsession, Strange Attractor Press, 2014, pages 205–207.
- Ronald Storrs; David McKitterick, ed., "Gaselee, Sir Stephen (1882–1943)" in Oxford Dictionary of National Biography (Oxford, 2004)
