= Observations (Belon book) =

1553 book by Pierre Belon

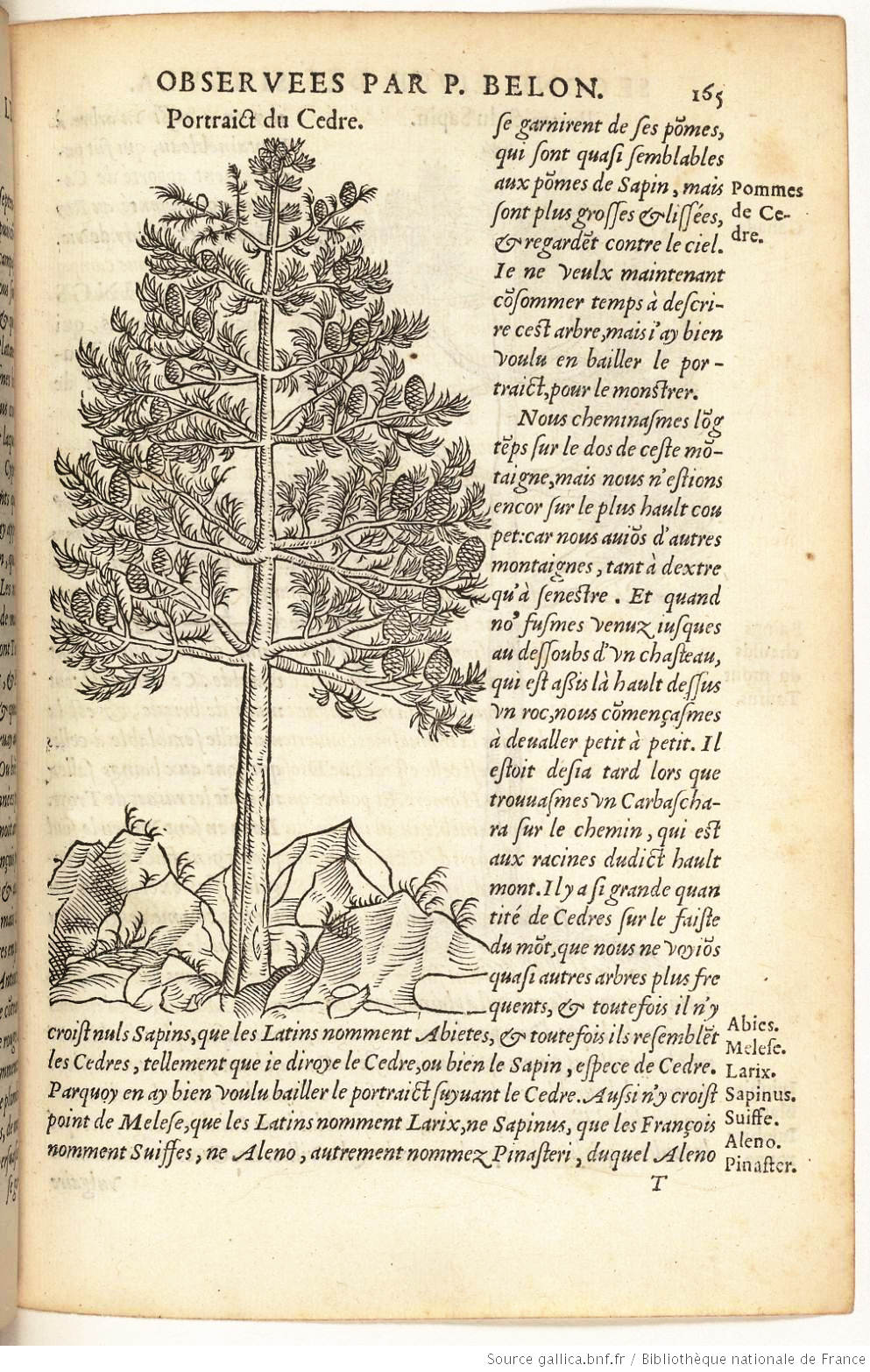
Cedars of God in Belon's Observations

Les observations de plusieurs singularitez et choses memorables trouvées en Grèce, Asie, Judée, Egypte, Arabie et autres pays estranges is a work of ethnographical, botanical and zoological exploration by Pierre Belon (1517–1564), a French naturalist from Le Mans. Starting in 1546, Belon travelled through Greece, Asia Minor, Egypt, Arabia and Palestine, returning to France in 1549.

His Observations, with illustrations, were first published in 1553. A second edition appeared in 1554, a third in 1555. The work was translated into Latin by Charles de l'Écluse (Carolus Clusius) and published in 1589 under the title Petri Bellonii Cenomani plurimorum singularium et memorabilium rerum ... observationes. The Latin text was reprinted as an appendix to Clusius's Exoticorum libri decem (1605).

== Editions ==
- 1553 edition at Gallica (Bibliothèque Nationale de France)
- 1588 edition at Google Books
- Voyage au Levant (1553). Les Observations de Pierre Belon du Mans, ed. Alexandra Merle, Paris: Chandeigne, 2001. ISBN 2-906462-50-0
- Travels in the Levant: The Observations of Pierre Belon of Le Mans on Many Singularities and Memorable Things Found in Greece, Turkey, Judaea, Egypt, Arabia and Other Foreign Countries (1553), ed. Alexandra Merle, tr. James Hogarth, Kilkerran: Hardinge Simpole, 2002. ISBN 9781843821960
