= John Frampton =

16th-century English merchant

John Frampton was a 16th-century English merchant from the West Country, who settled in Spain, was imprisoned and tortured by the Inquisition, and escaped from Cádiz in 1567. He became a translator of Spanish works, partly inspired by revenge.

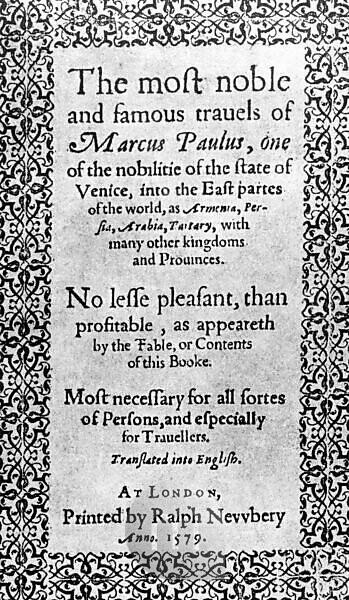
Tittle pages of The most noble and famous travels of Marcus Paulus translated by John Frampton (London, 1579), printed by Ralph Newbery

His publications have a markedly anti-Spanish tone and include:

- 1577: Nicolás Monardes, Ioyfull newes out of the newe founde worlde, wherein is declared the rare and singular vertues of diuerse and sundrie hearbes, trees, oyles, plantes, and stones, with their applications, as well for phisicke as chirurgerie, translated from the 1565 Spanish edition
- 1578: Martín Fernández de Enciso, Geography
- 1579: The most noble and famous travels of Marco Polo, translated from the 1503 Castilian translation
- 1579: Bernardino de Escalante, A discourse of the Navigation which the Portugales doe Make to the Realmes and Provinces of the East Partes of the Worlde, and of the knowledge that growes by them of the great thinges, which are in the Dominion of China: thought to be the second European book (although small) primarily dedicated to China, and the first of them to be made available in English
- 1580: Nicolás Monardes, Ioyfull newes out of the newe founde worlde: a new edition enlarged on the basis of the 1574 Spanish edition
- 1581: Pedro de Medina, Art of Navigation

== Bibliography ==
- Boxer, C. R. (1963), Two pioneers of tropical medicine: Garcia d'Orta and Nicolás Monardes, London: Wellcome Historical Medical Library
- Gaselee, Stephen, editor (1925), Joyfull newes out of the newe founde worlde (cover title: Frampton's Monardes), London: Constable
