= Pierre Belon =

French traveler, naturalist, writer and diplomat (1517-1564)

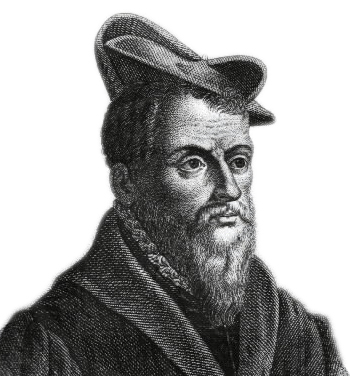
- Pierre Belon
- Born: 1517; Souletière near Cérans-Foulletourte, France
- Died: April 1564 (aged 46–47); Paris, France
- Scientific career
- Fields: Ichthyology; Natural history

Pierre Belon (1517–1564) was a French traveller, naturalist, writer and diplomat. Like many others of the Renaissance period, he studied and wrote on a range of topics including ichthyology, ornithology, botany, comparative anatomy, architecture and Egyptology. He is sometimes known as Pierre Belon du Mans, or, in the Latin in which his works appeared, as Petrus Bellonius Cenomanus. The Russian physiologist Ivan Pavlov (known for Pavlov's dogs) called him the "prophet of comparative anatomy".

== Life ==
Belon was born in 1517 at the hamlet of Souletière near Cérans-Foulletourte in the Pays de la Loire. Nothing is known about his descent. Somewhere between 1532 and 1535 he started working as an apprentice to René des Prez, born in Foulletourte but by then an apothecary to the bishop of Clermont, Guillaume Duprat. Between 1535 and 1538 he entered the service of René du Bellay, bishop of Le Mans, who allowed him to study medicine at the University of Wittenberg with the botanist Valerius Cordus (1515-1544). He travelled around Germany with Cordus in 1542, and on his return, he travelled through Flanders and to England. By the end of summer in 1542 he continued his studies at Paris. With the recommendation of Duprat, he became an apothecary to Cardinal François de Tournon. Under this patronage, he was able to undertake extensive scientific voyages. Starting in December 1546, he travelled through Greece, Crete, Asia Minor, Egypt, Arabia and Palestine, and returned to France in 1549. A full account of his Observations on this journey, with illustrations, was published in Paris, 1553. Returning to the household of Cardinal de Tournon at Rome for the Papal conclave, 1549-1550, Belon encountered the naturalists Guillaume Rondelet and Hippolyte Salviani. He returned to Paris with his copious notes and began to publish. In 1557 he travelled again, this time in northern Italy, Savoy, the Dauphiné and Auvergne.

Belon was highly favoured both by Henry II and by Charles IX, the latter of whom accorded him lodging in the Château de Madrid in the Bois de Boulogne. There he undertook the translations of Dioscurides and Theophrastus. Belon was murdered, possibly by thieves, one evening in April 1564, when coming through the Bois on his return from Paris.

== Works ==
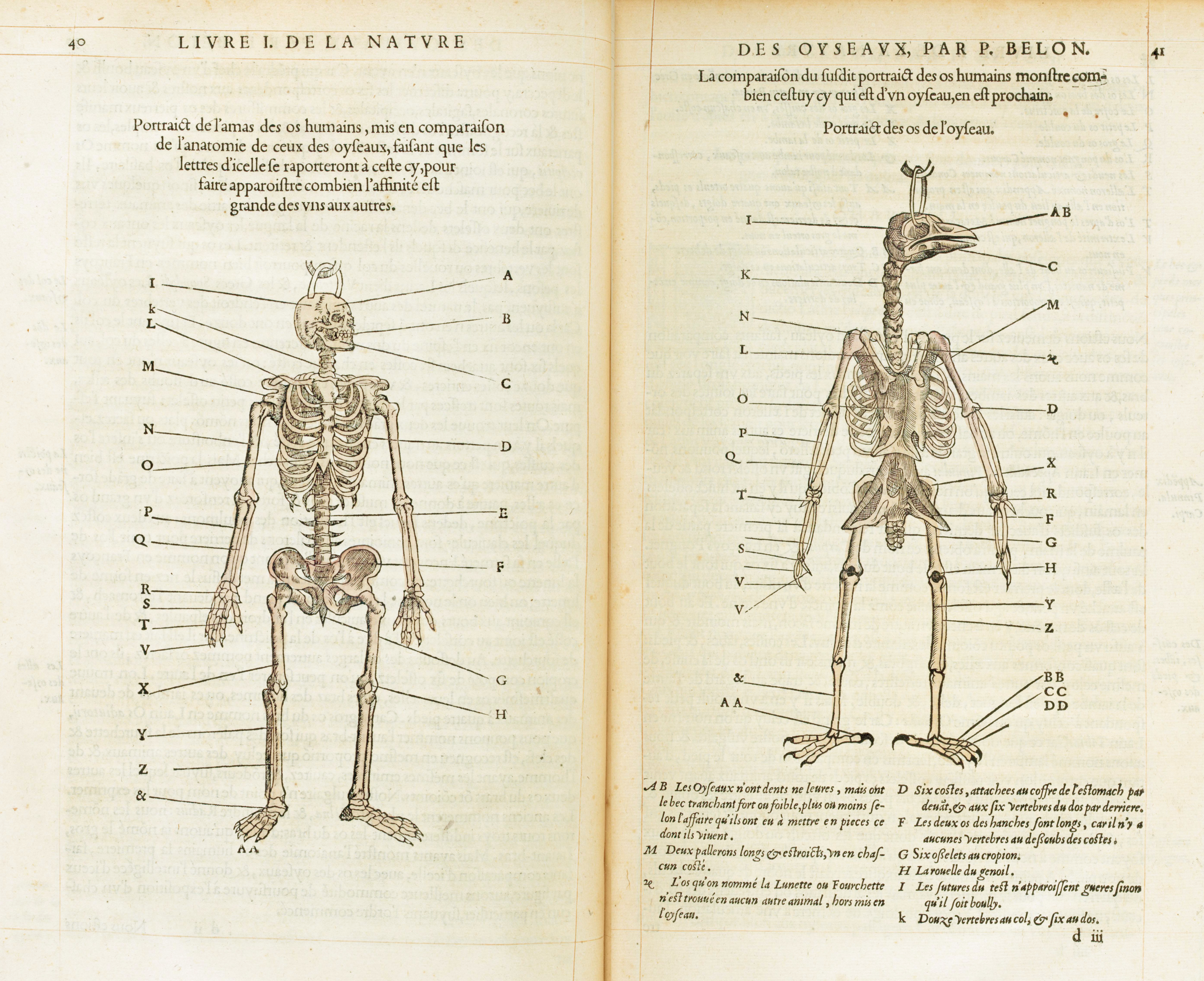
A comparison of the skeleton of birds and man in Natural History of Birds, 1555

Belon was typical of the Renaissance scholar and took an interest in "all kinds of good disciplines" in his lifetime. He was interested in zoology, botany and classical Antiquity. Besides the narrative of his travels he wrote several scientific works of considerable value.

His first book was Histoire naturelle des estranges poissons (1551) and despite its title was a work mainly on the dolphin; (Note: At that time the concept of fishes included all aquatic animals including mammals and the book included the first French illustration of a hippopotamus.) it did have woodcuts of some fishes, possibly the first among printed books in the West.

His second book, De aquatilibus (in Latin, 1553) greatly expanded on the first and included a description of 110 species of fish, with illustrations; it was a work that laid the foundation of modern ichthyology. Its French translation La nature et diversite des poissons (Paris, 1555) was followed by an edition of 1560, and the volume was reprinted in Frankfurt and Zurich. His works were translated by Carolus Clusius, and he was held in high authority by the Italian naturalist Ulisse Aldrovandi.

In his L'Histoire de la nature des oyseaux (1555) he included two figures of the skeletons of humans and birds, marking the homologous bones. This is widely seen as one of the earliest demonstrations of comparative anatomy.

=== Books ===
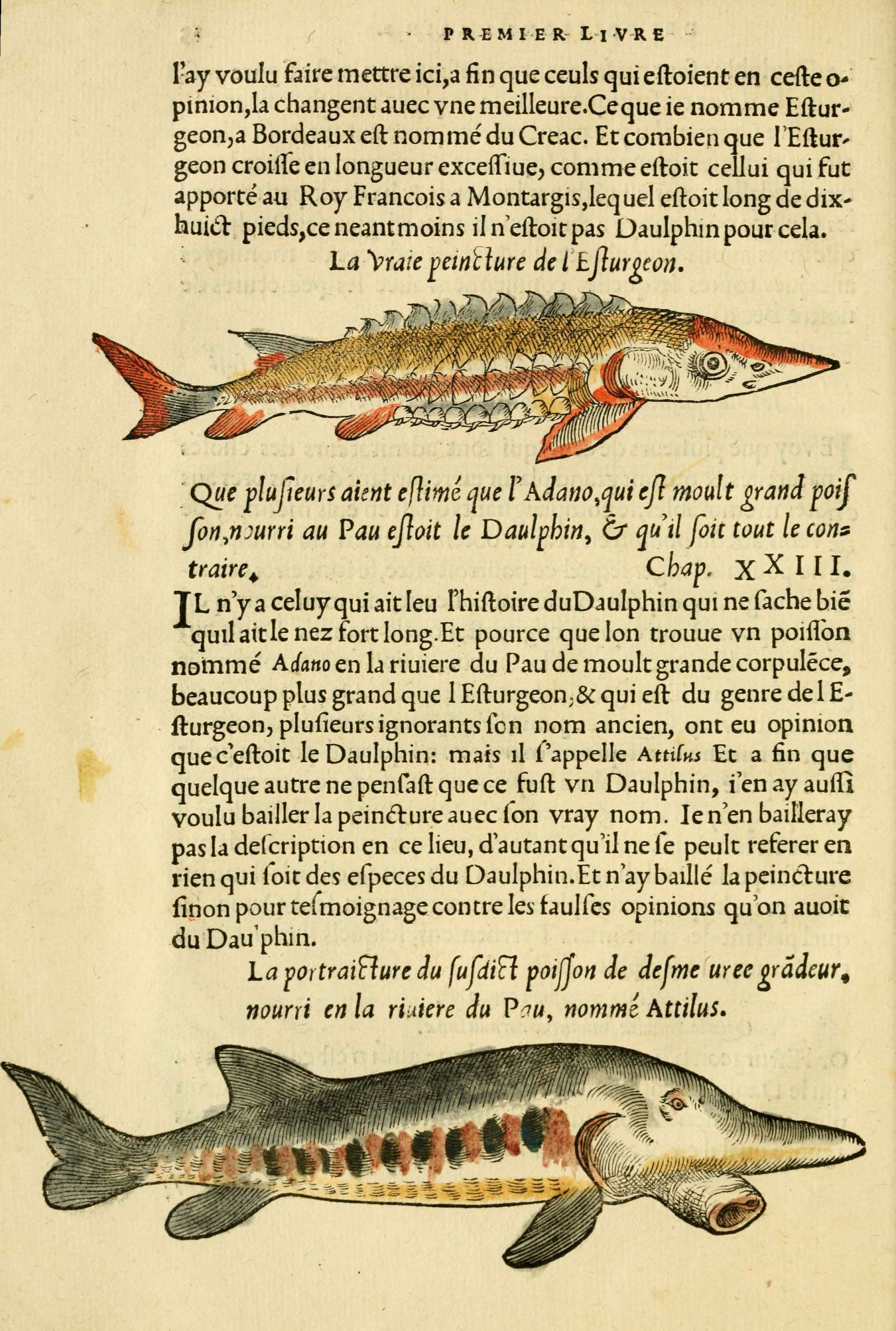
A page from Histoire de la nature des estranges poissons marins, 1551

All of the following were first published in Paris.

- 1551: L'histoire naturelle des estranges poissons marins, avec la vraie peincture & description du Daulphin, & de plusieurs autres de son espece. Observee par Pierre Belon du Mans. A Paris. 1551.
- 1553: De aquatilibus. Libri duo Cum eiconibus ad vivam ipsorum effigiem, Quoad eius fieri potuit, expressis. Parisiis, 1553.
  - 1555: La nature et diversite des poissons avec leurs pourtraicts representez au plus pres du naturel. Paris, 1555.
- 1553: De arboribus Coniferis, Resiniferis aliisque semper virentibus..., a basic text on conifers, pines and evergreens.
- De arboribus coniferis, resiniferis, aliis quoque nonnullis sempiterna fronde virentibus (in French). Paris: Guillaume Cavellat. 1553.
- 1553 De admirabili operi antiquorum et rerum suspiciendarum praestantia..., treating the funerary customs of Antiquity, in three volumes, of which separate titles head the second, on mummification (De medicato funere seu cadavere condito et lugubri defunctorum ejulatione) and third (De medicamentis nonnullis, servandi cadaveris vim obtinentibus).
- 1553: Les observations de plusieurs singularitez et choses memorables trouvées en Grèce, Asie, Judée, Egypte, Arabie et autres pays étrangèrs.
- 1555: revised edition of the Observations; it was translated into Latin for an international readership by Clusius, 1589.
- Histoire de la nature des oyseaux (in French). Paris: Guillaume Cavellat. 1555.
- Portraits d'oyseaux, animaux, serpens, herbes, arbres, hommes et femmes, d'Arabie et Egypte (in French). Paris: Guillaume Cavellat. 1557.
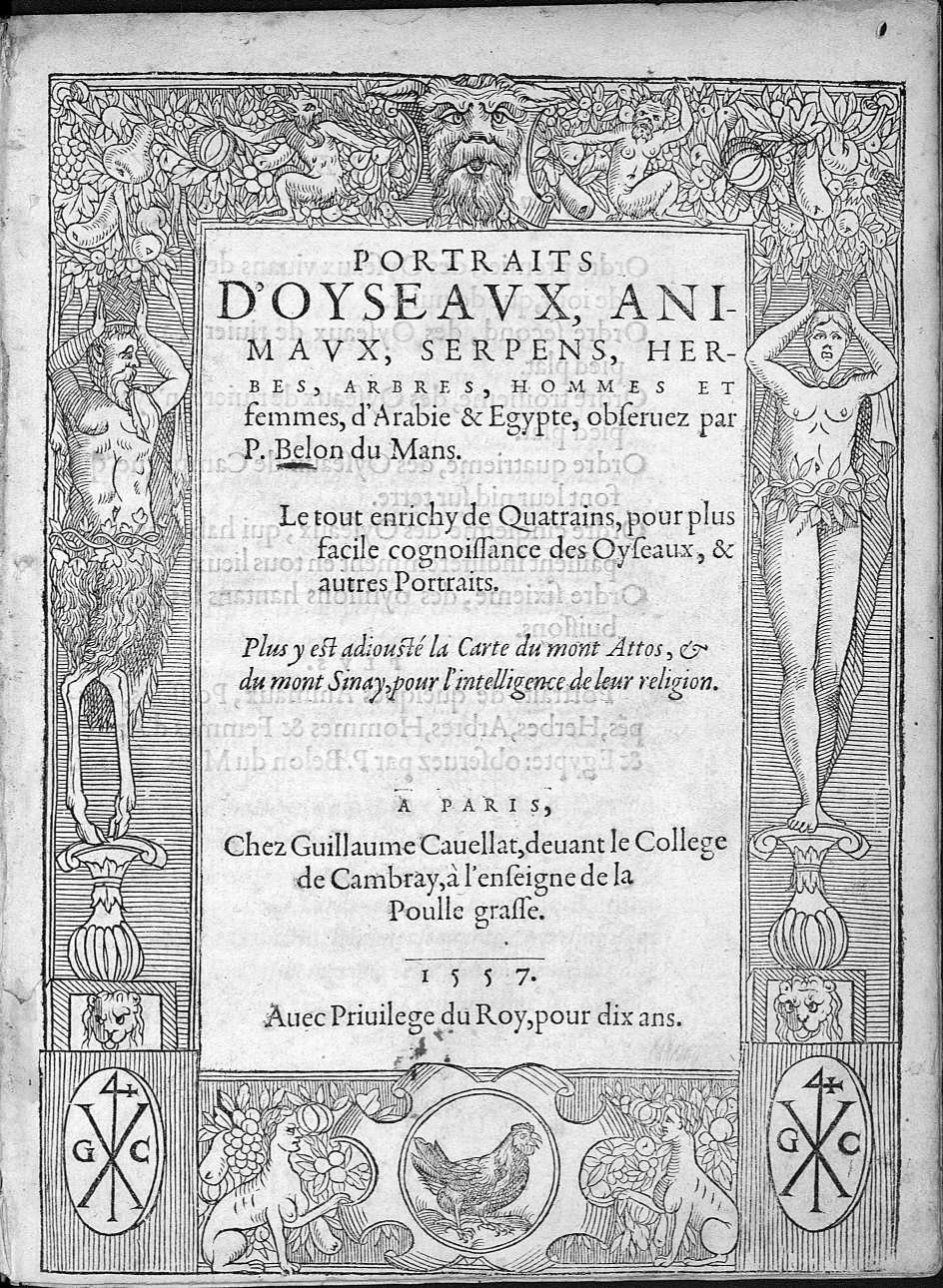
Portraits d'oyseaux, animaux, serpens, herbes, arbres, hommes et femmes, d'Arabie et Egypte, 1557

== Memorials ==
A genus in the plant family Gesneriaceae was named as Bellonia in his honour by Charles Plumier. A statue of Belon was erected at Le Mans in 1887.
