= Hippolito Salviani =

Italian physician, scholar and naturalist

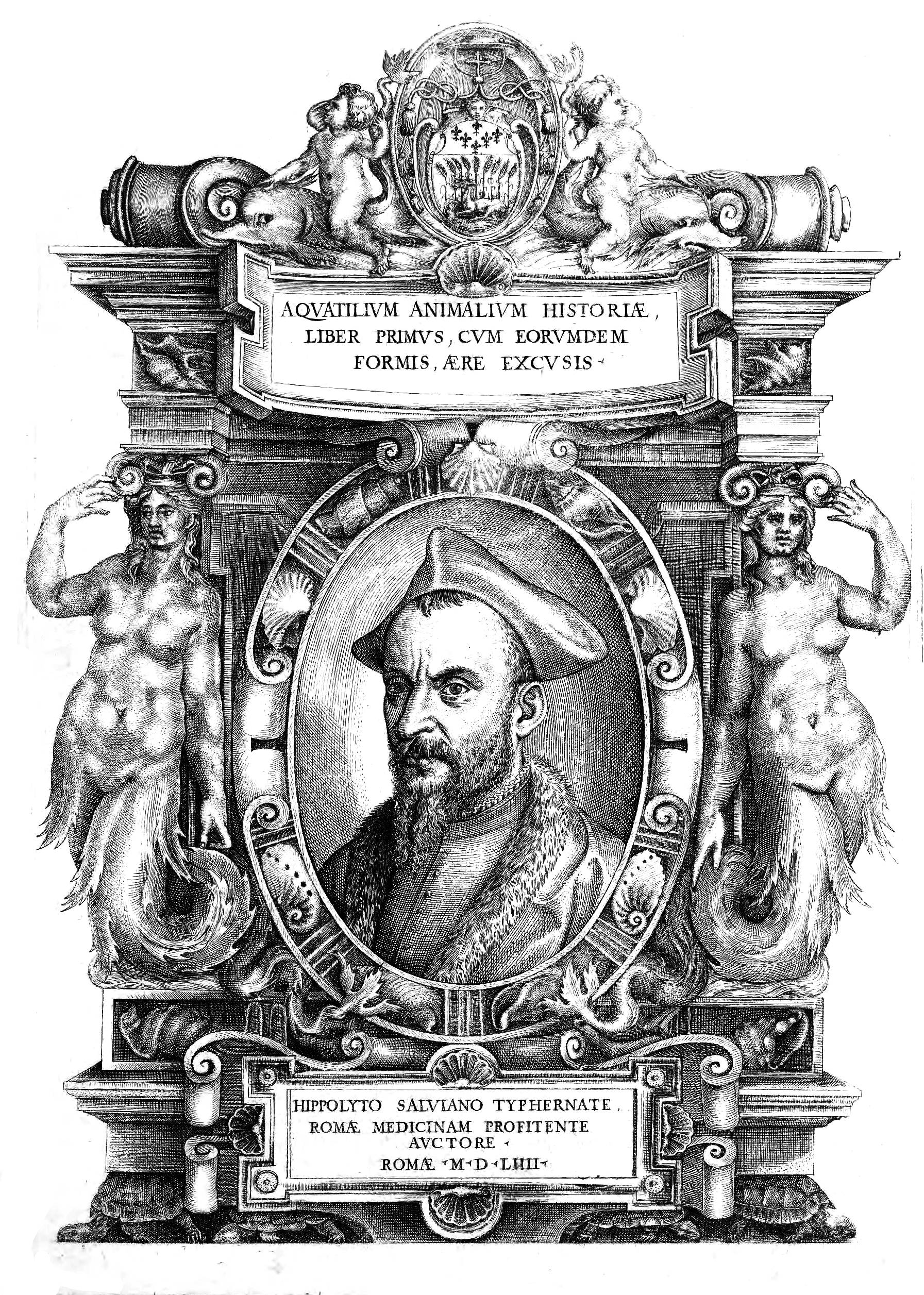
Portrait of Hippolito Salviani from the frontispiece of his Aquatilium animalium historiae

Hippolito Salviani (1514–1572) was an Italian physician, scholar and naturalist, noted for the Renaissance book Aquatilium animalium historiae, depicting about a hundred Mediterranean fish species, some from Illyria, and a few mollusks. He also wrote works on medicine, such as that dealing with Galen's theory of crises, and a topical play. Salviani taught at the University of Rome until 1568. From 1550 until 1555 he was chief physician to the House of Farnese and three successive popes, Pope Julius III, Pope Marcellus II and Pope Paul IV.

== Life and work ==
Salviani was born in Città di Castello in the noble family of Aurelia Tiberti and Salustio. He was in Rome between 1538 and 1540. He studied medicine, becoming a physician for the family of Pope Julius III around 1550. Pope Julius III appointed him as a Roman citizen through a mote proprio. He developed a great interest in ichthyology and in natural history generally. He was a doctor at Santo Spirito in 1551-52. He was a professor of practical medicine at the University and taught around 1552 and 1569 at the Studium Urbis, alongside the anatomist Bartolomeo Eustachi. In 1565 he was appointed conservatore of Rome. He enjoyed the financial support of Cardinal Cervini (later Pope Marcellus II), enabling him to explore the Mediterranean coastline. Cervini's death caused Salviani to dedicate the work to Pope Paul IV whom he served as papal physician. His only medical work was De crisibus ad Galeni censuram (1556).

Aristotle's work on fish species is one of the earliest known. In the 1500s fish enjoyed a renewed interest in both France and Italy. 1551 saw the appearance of Pierre Belon’s Histoire naturelle des estranges poissons marins, illustrated by woodcuts. In 1554 Guillaume Rondelet’s De piscibus marinis was published, also using woodcuts. Salviani’s work was published in parts over a period of three years. Salviani corresponded with Aldrovandi on fishes. Salviani's book used copper engraving which was well-suited to depicting fish, and greatly superior to woodcuts with its lifelike rendition of eyes and scales. The copper engravings have a scientific appearance, but some details, like the correct number and position of the scales were omitted. Nicolas Béatrizet probably designed the title-page and the fish illustrations were made by Antoine Lafréry. Another theory is that they were drawn by the Italian painter Bernardus Aretinus or the Spanish artist Gaspar Becerra (who studied under Michelangelo) and then engraved by Nicolas Béatrizet. Salviani's Aquatilium animalium historiae (1554-1558) only deals with animals personally observed and handled by him. It is believed that the fish specimens were salted and dried resulting in some of the inaccuracies. Rondelet accused Salviani of plagiarism and Salviani responded by stating that his images were lifelike unless the crude ones of Rondelet. He noted that cephalopods were distinct from fishes. He collected most of the fishes for his studies from the market in Rome. It has been suggested that Salviani may have owned and controlled the printing of books. Members of the family like Valerio Salviani in Rome and Orazio Salviani in Naples were also involved in publishing and sales of books. The Salviani family's association with printing may have extended to publishing and bookselling.

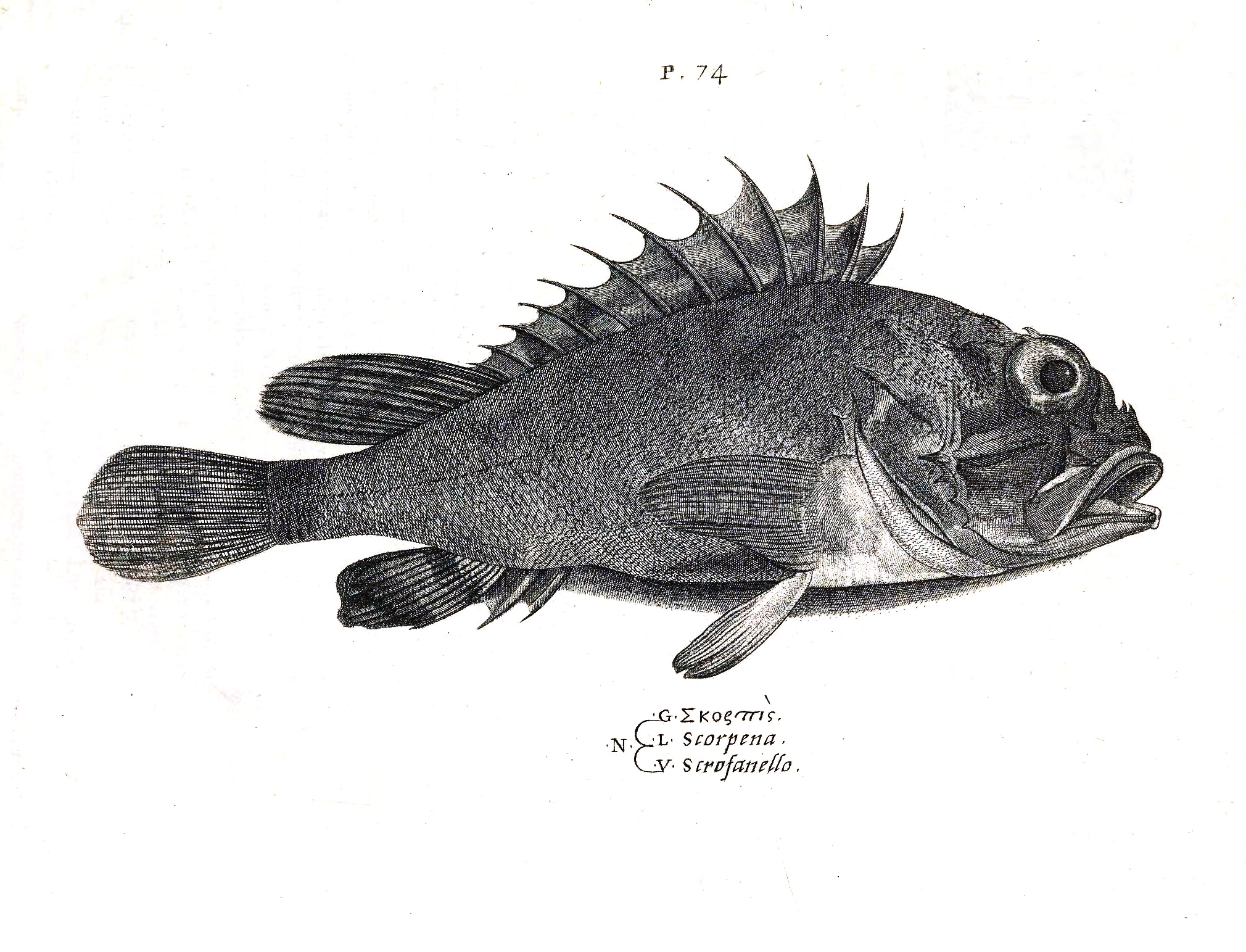

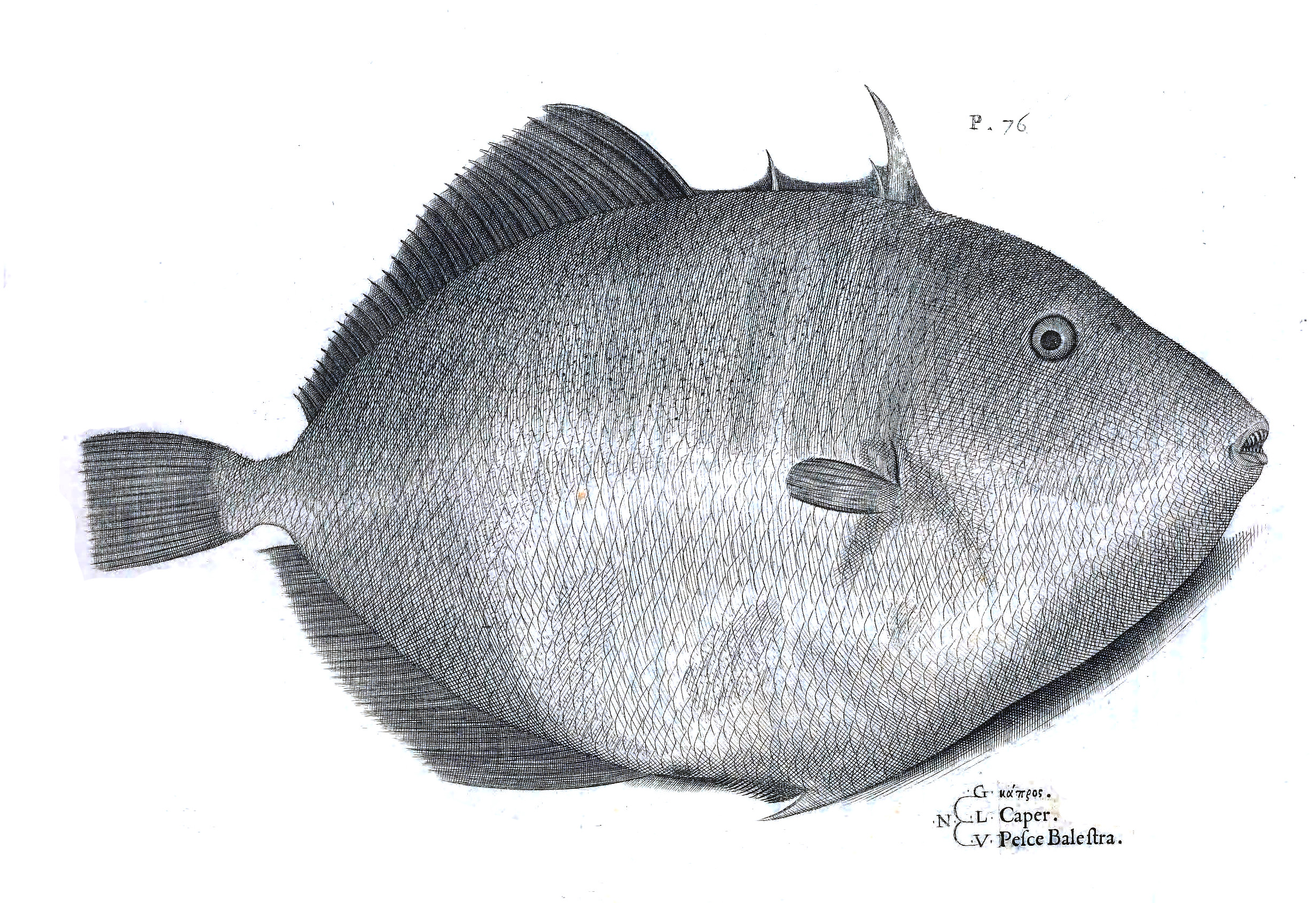

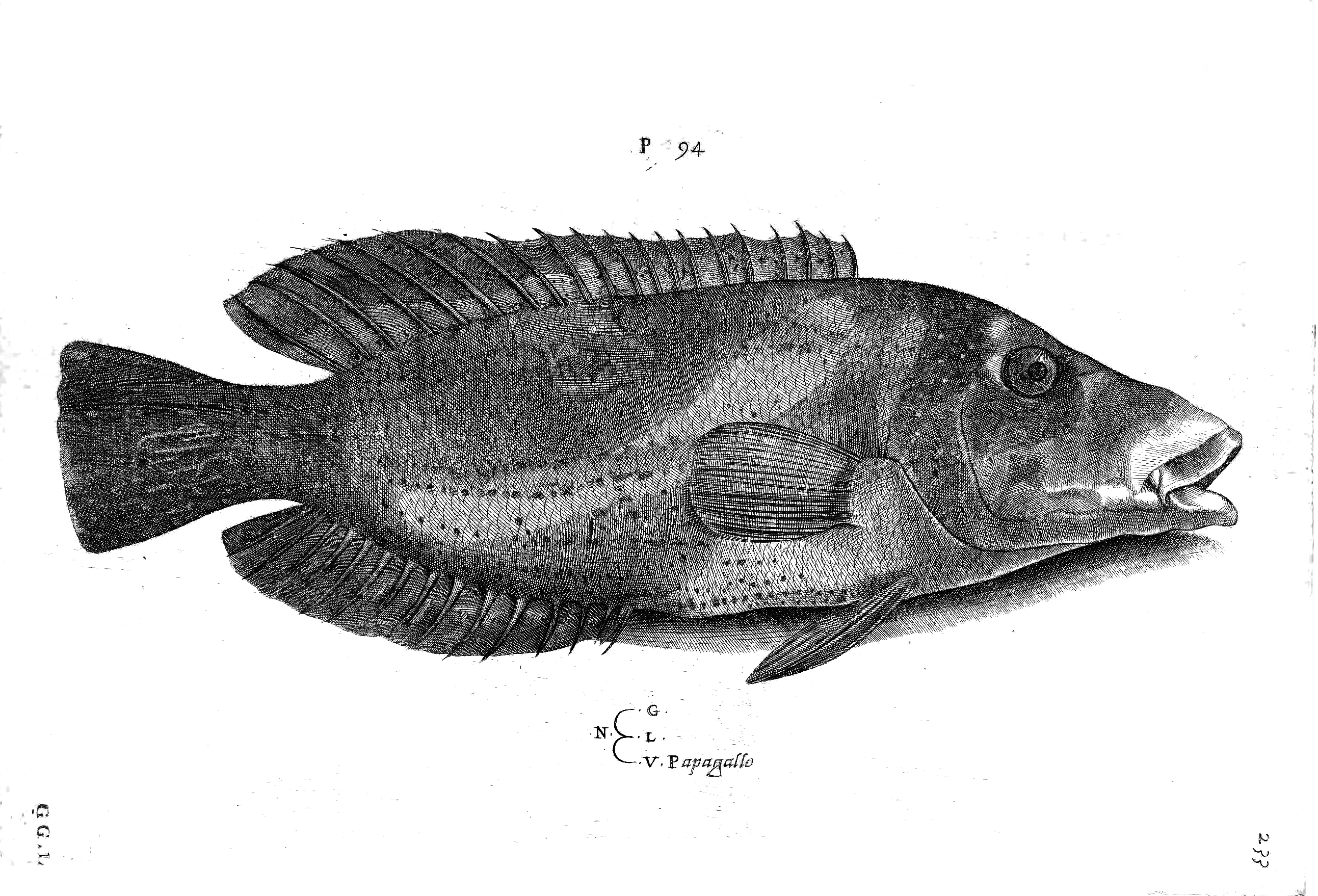

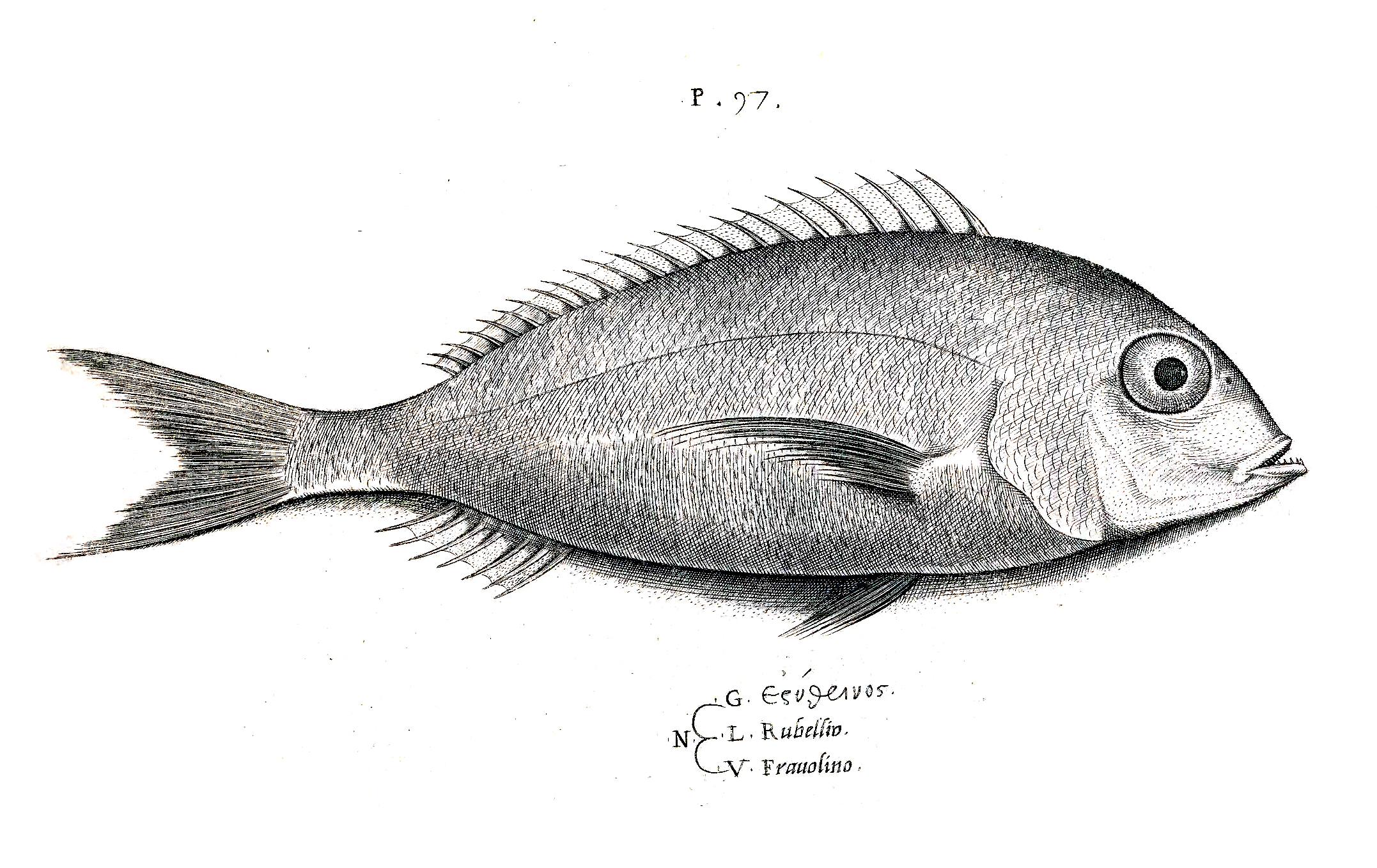
