= Garcia de Orta =

Portuguese botanist (1501–1568)

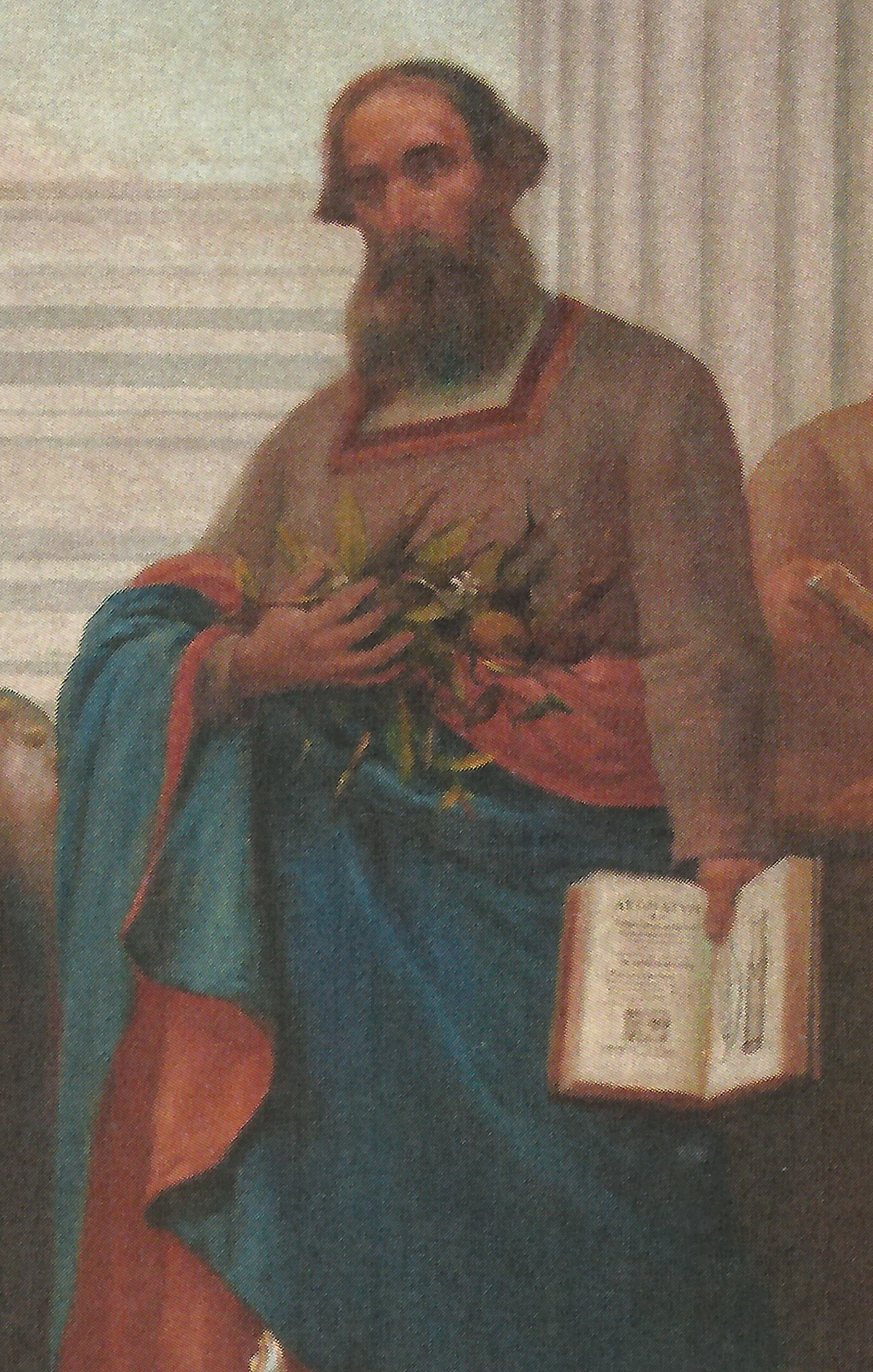
- Garcia de Orta, from a 1906 painting by Veloso Salgado (NOVA Medical School, Lisbon)
- Born: c. 1501; Castelo de Vide, Kingdom of Portugal
- Died: 1568; Old Goa, Portuguese India
- Occupations: Physician and naturalist

Garcia de Orta (or Garcia d'Orta; 1501–1568) was a Portuguese physician, herbalist, and naturalist, who worked primarily in Goa and Bombay in Portuguese India. A pioneer of tropical medicine, pharmacognosy, and ethnobotany, Garcia used an experimental approach to the identification and the use of herbal medicines, rather than relying completely on received knowledge. His most famous work is Colóquios dos simples e drogas da India, a book on simples (herbs used individually and not mixed with others) and drugs. Published in 1563, it is the earliest treatise on the medicinal and economic plants of India. Carolus Clusius translated it into Latin, which was widely used as a standard reference text on medicinal plants. Garcia de Orta was of Jewish ancestry and died before the Goa Inquisition, his sister Catarina was however burnt at the stake in 1569 for being a secret Jew and, based on her confession, his remains too were exhumed and burnt along with an effigy at an auto-da-fé. Memorials recognizing his contributions have been built in both Portugal and India.

== Life ==
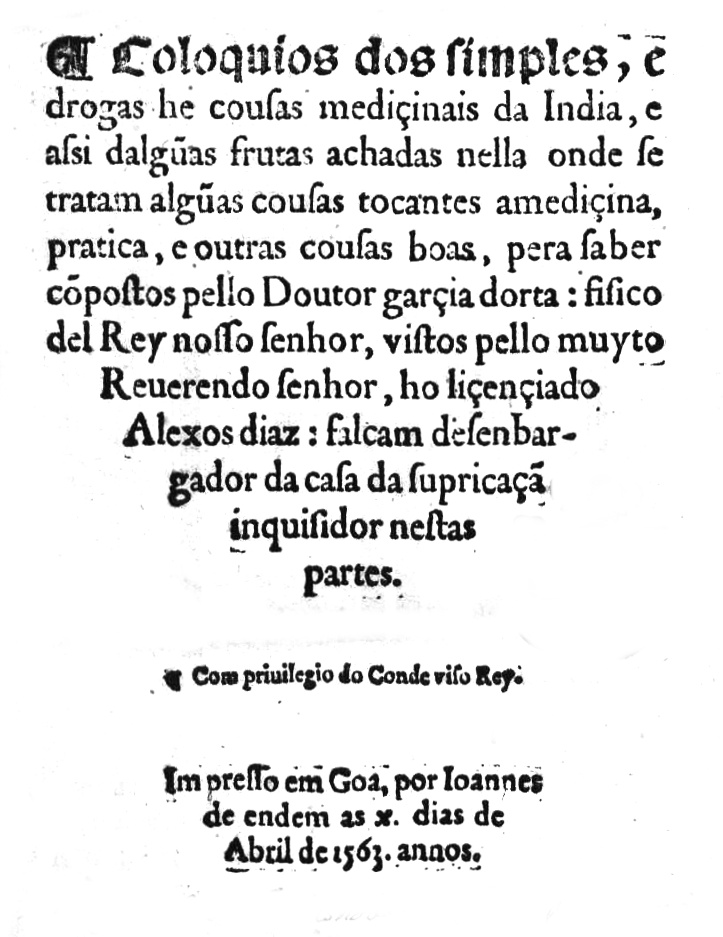
Title page of Colóquios (1563)

Garcia de Orta was born in Castelo de Vide, probably in 1501, the son of Fernão (Isaac) da Orta, a merchant, and Leonor Gomes. He had three sisters, Violante, Catarina and Isabel. Their parents were Spanish Jews from Valencia de Alcántara who had taken refuge, as many others did, in Portugal at the time of the great expulsion of the Spanish Jews by the Reyes Catolicos Ferdinand and Isabella of Spain in 1492. Forcibly converted to Christianity in 1497, they were pejoratively classed as Cristãos Novos (New Christians) and marranos ("swine"). Some of these refugees maintained their Jewish faith secretly. A friendly neighbor at Castelo de Vide was the nobleman Dom Fernão de Sousa, Lord of Labruja, who may have influenced the idea for Garcia's father to send him to University. Dom Fernão's son Martim Afonso de Sousa would become a key figure in later life.

Garcia studied medicine, arts and philosophy at the Universities of Alcalá de Henares and Salamanca in Spain. He graduated and returned to Portugal in 1525, two years after his father's death. He practiced medicine first in his hometown and from 1526 onwards in Lisbon, where he gained a lectureship at the university in 1532. He also became a royal physician to John III of Portugal.

Perhaps fearing the increasing power of the Portuguese Inquisition, and fortunately evading the ban on emigration of New Christians, he sailed for Portuguese India leaving the Tagus in March 1534 as Chief Physician aboard the fleet of Martim Afonso de Sousa, later to be named Governor. He reached Goa in September. He travelled with Sousa on various campaigns, then, in 1538, settled at Goa, where he soon had a prominent medical practice. He was a physician to Burhan Nizam Shah I of the Nizam Shahi dynasty of Ahmadnagar, and concurrently to several successive Portuguese Viceroys and governors of Goa. While Garcia de Orta was a physician of the Sultan and teacher of Portuguese of his son, the Prince, he met and dined several times with the high ranking cavalry general of the Sultan, Firangi Khan. Garcia de Orta reports that the cavalry commander sometimes violated religious directives, eating pork and drinking wine in these private dinners. Firangi Khan had converted to Islam for apparently material reasons and had a very important role in the court of the Sultanate, but subsidized charities to Misericórdias in the relationship he had with the Portuguese empire (despite serving an intermittent enemy Muslim state) and, according to Orta, "urged other Christians to never abdicate their principles." He even projected return to his home city in his country (already secretly pardoned by the viceroy Afonso de Noronha). Firangi Khan was not his title (and name, which literally means "foreigner Khan") of origin. His name was Sancho Pires, a former gunner (bombardeiro), Portuguese, and natural of Matosinhos. He died in battle in India.

The King of Portugal through the Viceroy Dom Pedro Mascarenhas granted a lifelong lease (on payment of a quit-rent) to Garcia da Orta for the Ilha da Boa Vida ("the Island of the Good Life") which became a part of Bombay. This was probably somewhere between September 1554 and June 1555. The only condition of the lease was that he had to improve the place. He had a manor house with a large garden. He probably maintained an excellent library here. This manor stood not far from where the Town Hall of Bombay was built. Garcia probably let out the house to Simao Toscano. At the time of Bombay's transfer to the English, the manor was occupied by Dona Ignez de Miranda, widow of Dom Rodrigo de Monsanto. It was in this house that the treaty by which Bombay was transferred to the English was signed by Humphrey Cooke on February 18, 1665. Garcia describes the people around Bassein and their traditions in his book.

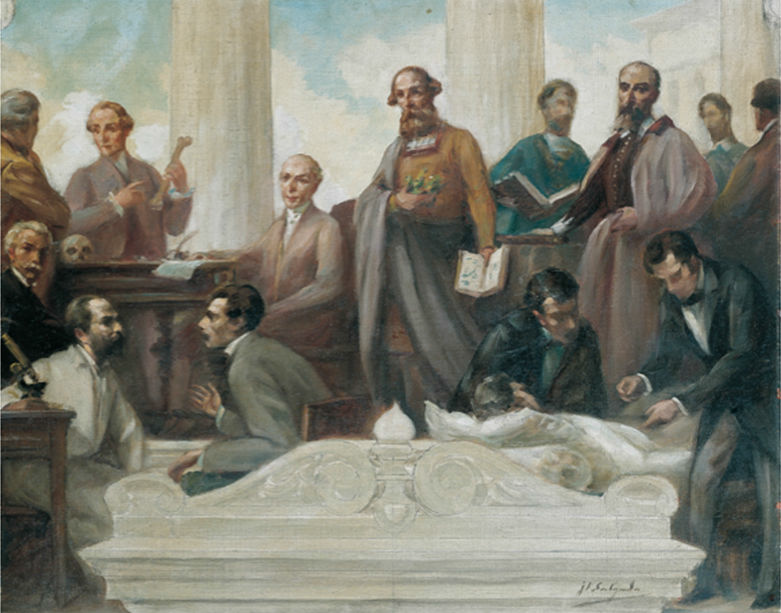
Painting by Veloso Salgado (1905) depicting Garcia de Orta and other physicians including Amatus Lusitanus, Sousa Martins, and Câmara Pestana.

Contrary to some early biographical accounts, Garcia de Orta married a wealthy cousin, Brianda de Solis, in 1543; the marriage was unhappy, but the couple had two daughters. In 1549, his mother and two of his sisters, who had been imprisoned as Jews in Lisbon, managed to join him in Goa. According to a confession by his brother-in-law after his death, Garcia de Orta privately continued to assert that "the Law of Moses was the true law"; in other words, he, probably in common with others in his family, remained a Jewish believer. In 1565, an inquisitorial court was opened in Goa. Active persecution against Jews, secret Jews, Hindus and New Christians began. Garcia himself died in 1568, apparently without having suffered seriously from this persecution, but his sister Catarina was arrested as a Jew in the same year and was burned at the stake for Judaism in Goa on October 25, 1569. Garcia himself was posthumously convicted of Judaism. His remains were exhumed and burned along with an effigy in an auto da fé on December 4, 1580. A compilation of the auto-da-fé statistics of the Goa Inquisition from 1560 to 1812 reveal that a total of 57 persons (crypto-Jews, crypto-Muslims, etc.) were burnt in the flesh and 64 in effigy (i.e. a statue resembling the person). The fate of his daughters is not known. During his lifetime, Orta's family members, including his mother and sisters were arrested and interrogated briefly in Portugal but they were probably protected by his friend and patron, Martim Afonso de Sousa, who was Governor-General of Portuguese India from 1542 to 1545.

== Work ==
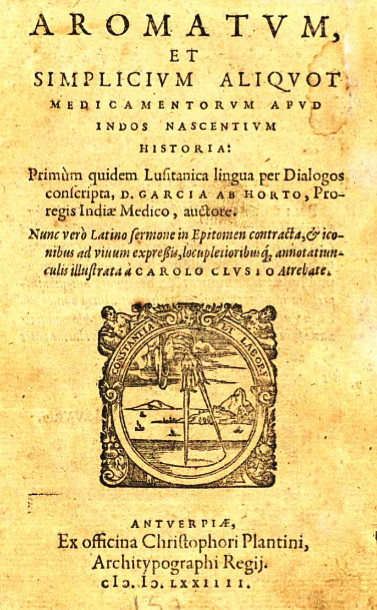
Cover of Clusius' 1574 Latin translation.

Garcia de Orta's busy practice evidently prevented him from travelling much beyond the west coast of India, but in the busy market and trading hub of Goa he met spice merchants, traders and physicians from many parts of southern Asia and the Indian Ocean coasts. He was confident in Portuguese, Spanish, Hebrew, Latin, Greek and Arabic (he did not know Sanskrit); his work shows that he gathered considerable knowledge from traditional medicine practitioners from several regions of India. Correspondents and agents sent him seeds and plants; he also traded in spices, drugs and precious stones. He evidently kept a laboratory and botanical garden. De Orta was influenced by Yunnani medicine as well as Ayurveda, although quoting Galen, al-Rhazi and Ibn-Sina more often. He tended to use European approaches in medicine and only when they failed did he make use of local methods.

His remarkable knowledge of Eastern spices and drugs is revealed in his only known work, Colóquios dos simples e drogas he cousas medicinais da Índia ("Conversations on the simples, drugs and medicinal substances of India"), the first edition of which was published at Goa in 1563. This book deals with a series of substances, many of them unknown or the subject of confusion and misinformation in Europe at this period. For instance, prior to his publication, tamarind was thought to come from a palm tree. He also noted many details on plants and their propagation. He was the first European to describe the symptoms of several Asiatic tropical diseases, notably cholera; he performed an autopsy on a cholera victim, the first recorded autopsy in India. Garcia de Orta reveals in his writings an unusual independence in the face of the usually revered texts of ancient authorities, Greek, Latin and Arabic. The Coloquios has 59 chapters and it was written in the style of a dialogue between da Orta and a traditional doctor, Ruano. Using a dialogue form was a common literary practice when dealing with the tensions between established and new forms of knowledge. Orta's work questions assumptions made in the past with alternative hypotheses to the ideas from Ibn-Sina and Averroes. His scientific method has been suggested to be a combination of empiricism and hypothesism.

Da Orta critiqued the work of Leonhart Fuchs. Through his character he commented that Fuchs "...knew little of physic, and still less of things to save his soul, being a heretic condemned for Lutheranism. His books were put in the condemned catalogue" and "though medicine is not the science of the Christian religion, still I abhor the author".

In one place he points out that the Portuguese traders took little interest in acquiring knowledge:

The Portuguese, who navigate over a greater part of the world only procure a knowledge of how best to dispose of that merchandise of what they bring here and what they shall take back. They are not desirous of knowing anything about the things in the countries they visit. If they know a product they do not learn from what tree it comes, and if they see it they do not compare it with one of our Indian trees, nor ask about its fruit or what it is like.

The printing press was introduced into Goa in 1556. The printer for Garcia is thought to have been João de Endem who began with Joao Quinquenio de Campania and continued after him. The rare first edition was full of typographical errors and was only the fifth European book ever printed in Goa and among the first few from India. The errata, probably the longest in printing history, ran to twenty pages and end with a statement that the list was probably incomplete. The English translation by Clements Markham included illustrations of some of the Indian plants by Cristóvão da Costa. Markham considered da Costa's work published in Spanish in 1578, Tractado de las drogas y medicinas de las Indias orientales ("Treatise of the drugs and medicines of the East Indies") to be largely based on that of de Orta but some others have pointed out significant differences.

Garcia's travels to Portuguese Ceylon (Jaffna) on campaigns with Martim allowed him to study Sri Lankan medicinal plants. Among the descriptions from here are plants used in the treatment of snakebite. Some of the information is based on folklore, such as the plants that were supposedly eaten by mongoose after being bitten by cobras. Orta also described plants of forensic importance such as the use of Datura used by thieves and robbers to poison their victims.

The preface of the book includes a verse by his friend, the poet Luís de Camões, now considered as Portugal's national poet. Luis de Camões had worked briefly in Portuguese Macau before returning to Goa in 1561. In his poem Os Lusíadas, Camões plays on the word "Orta" which refers to his friend as well as meaning "garden". The book was dedicated to Dom Francisco Coutinho, Count of Redondo, Viceroy of Goa from 1561 to 1564, and to his friend Martim de Sousa. In the preface he pointed out that he could well have written the book in Latin but chose Portuguese so that the traders and other locals could make use of it.

Garcia de Orta's work was accidentally discovered by Clusius in early 1564 and he translated it into Latin, while also changing it from a dialogue to an epitomized form, and this was widely read across Europe and underwent several editions.

== Books ==
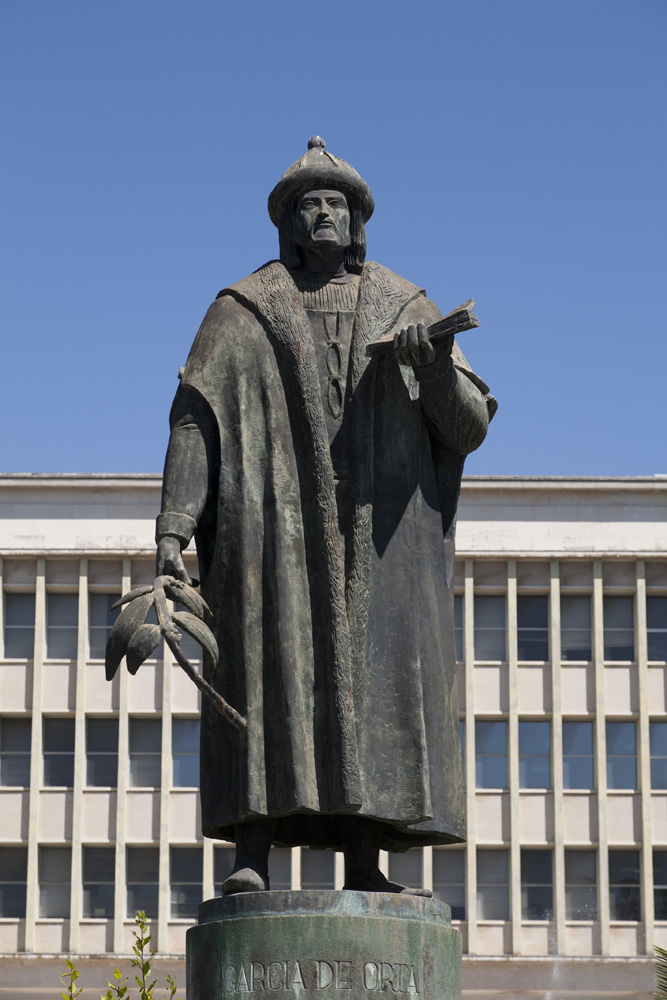
Statue of Garcia de Orta by Martins Correia at the Institute of Hygiene and Tropical Medicine, Lisbon

The first edition of Garcia de Orta's book was in Portuguese and published from Goa in 1563 and had 217 pages. Only about six copies were thought to exist according to Valentine Ball in 1890. A second version was published in Lisbon in 1872. An abridged Latin version was produced by Carolus Clusius in 1567 with subsequent editions in 1574, 1579, 1582, 1584, 1593, 1595 and 1605/6. A translation of the Latin version into Italian was produced by Annibal de Briganti in 1576, followed by other editions in 1582, 1589 and 1616. A Spanish version of the Tractado of Cristobal A'Costa which included Clusius's abridgement and A'Costas's personal observation was published in 1578 from Burgos.

- Coloquios dos Simples e Drogas da India. Band 1 . Imprensa nacional, Lisboa 1891 (Digital edition by the University and State Library Düsseldorf)
- Coloquios dos Simples e Drogas da India. Band 2 . Imprensa nacional, Lisboa 1892 (Digital edition by the University and State Library Düsseldorf)
- Histoire des drogues, espiceries, et de certains medicamens simples, qui naissent és Indes et en l'Amerique : divisé en deux parties: La première comprise en 4 livres: Les deux premiers de Garcie Du Jardin, le troisième de Christophle de La Coste, et le quatrième de l'histoire du baulme, adjousteée de nouveau en ceste 2. éd.: où il est prouvé, que nous avons le vray baulme d'Arabie, contre l'opinion des anciens et modernes; la seconde composée de deux livres de maistre Nicolas Monard traictant de ce qui nous est apporté de l'Amerique.... Lyon : Pillehotte, 1619. (Digital edition of the University and State Library Düsseldorf.)

== Legacy ==
Garcia's work influenced a number of later herbals and botanical works including those by Juan Fragoso, Nicolas Monardes, Hendrik van Rheede and Jacobus Bontius. The "Jardim Garcia de Orta", a public garden in Lisbon, as well the "Escola Secundária Garcia de Orta" high school in Porto and the "Hospital Garcia de Orta" in Almada, are named in his memory.

In Goa, the municipal garden (built in 1855) in the capital city of Panjim has been named as "Garcia de Orta" in his memory. It is located facing the main city square that also houses the majestic church of Our Lady of Immaculate conception (Nossa Senhora da Concepção Imaculada) and was renovated in 2010.

A postal stamp of Garcia de Orta was released by Portugal in 1963. In 1971, the 20 Escudos bank note carried a picture of Garcia de Orta.

== Name variants ==
Garcia de Orta has been Latinized in some works as "Garcias ab Horto" and then translated variously with some French works referring to him as "de la Huerta" and "Dujardin".
