= Carolus Clusius =

Artois doctor and botanist (1526–1609)

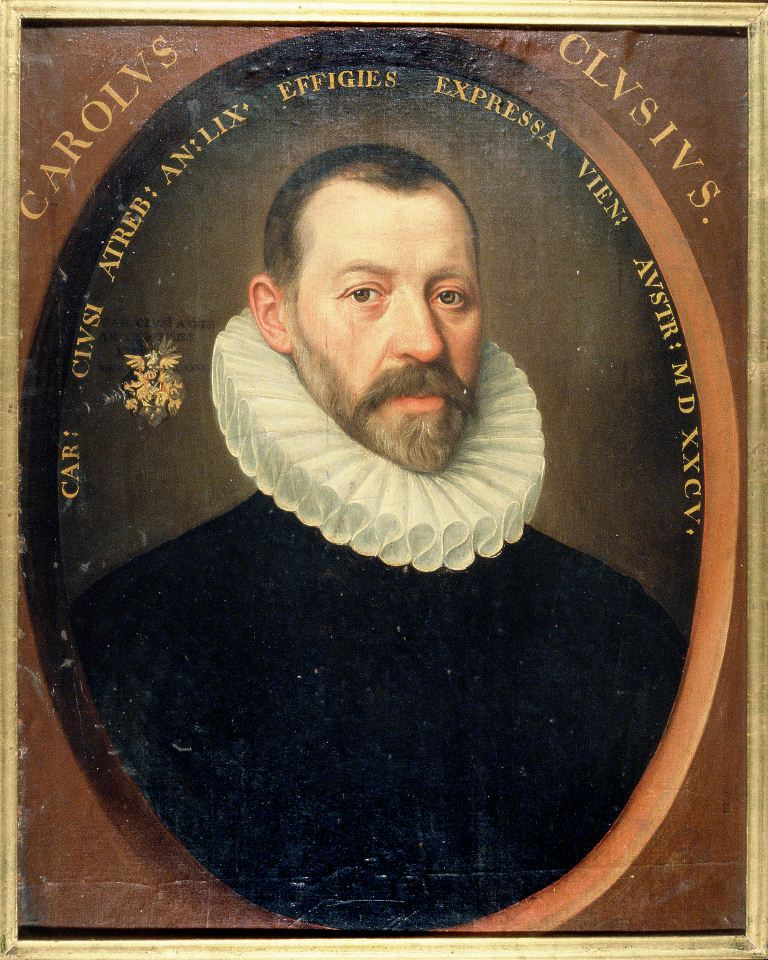
- Carolus Clusius 1585
- Born: 19 February 1526; Arras
- Died: 4 April 1609 (aged 83); Leiden
- Education: University of Montpellier
- Known for: Treatises on plants, national flora
- Scientific career
- Fields: Botany, horticulture
- Workplaces: University of Leiden, Hortus Botanicus Leiden
- Author abbrev. (botany): Clus.

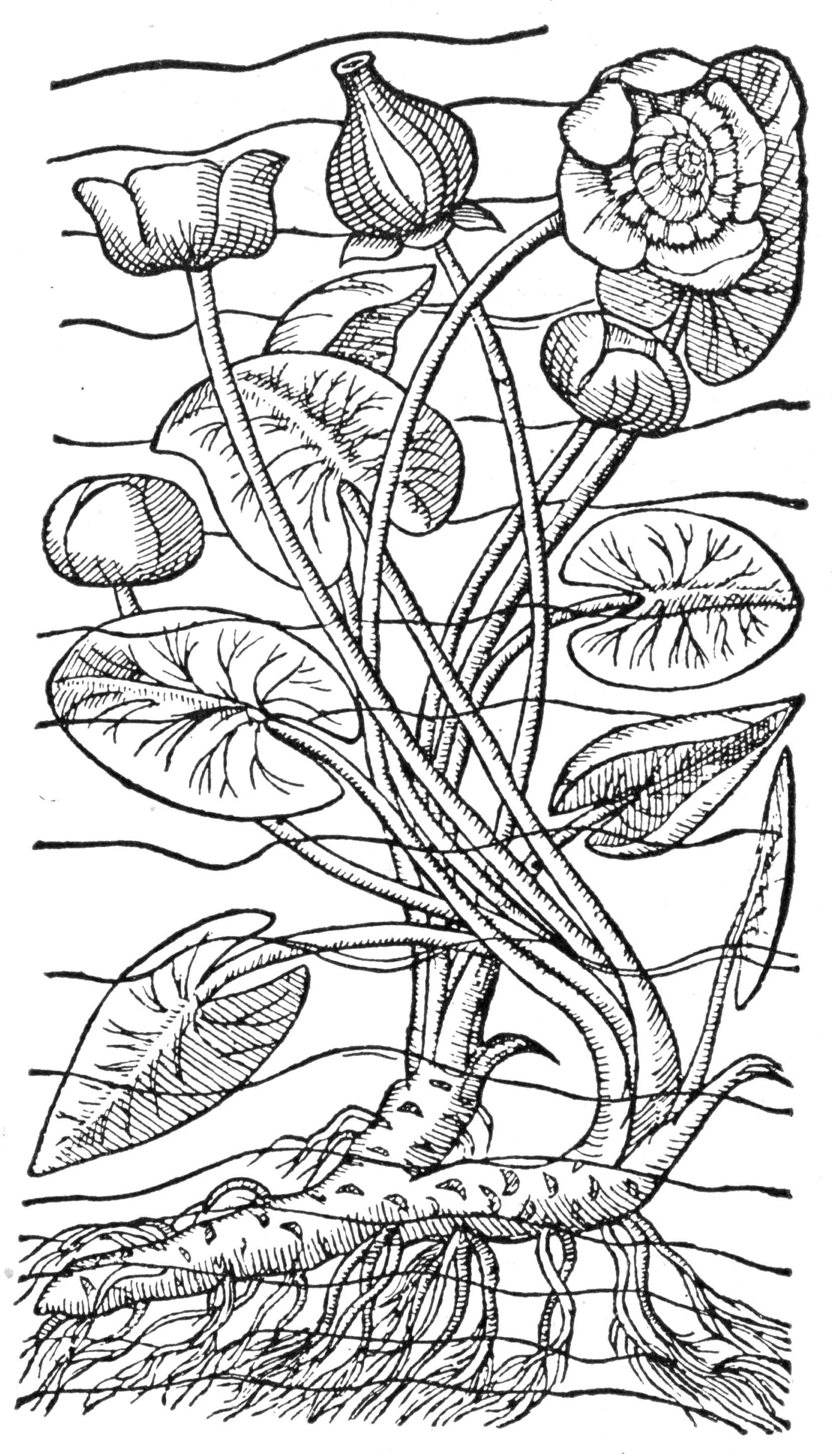
"Nymphaea" (depicting the plant now known as Nuphar lutea) from Rariorum plantarum historia

Charles de l'Écluse, L'Escluse, or Carolus Clusius (19 February 1526 – 4 April 1609), seigneur de Watènes, was an Artois doctor and pioneering botanist, perhaps the most influential of all 16th-century scientific horticulturists.

== Life ==
Clusius was born Charles de l' Écluse in 1526, in Arras (Dutch Atrecht), then in the County of Artois, Spanish Netherlands, now northern France (Hauts-de-France). At the urging of his father, who wanted him to enter the law, he commenced his studies in Latin and Greek at Louvain, followed by civil law. His father then gave him some money to move to Marburg to further his legal studies, but after eight months when his mentor moved away from Marburg he switched to theology, initially at Marburg and then on the suggestion of one of his professors at Wittenberg, where he also began a study of philosophy. Even at Marburg he had also developed an interest in plants that he continued in Wittenberg. Aware of the emerging study of botany, he decided to move to France to study medicine at the University of Montpellier (1551–1554), under professor Guillaume Rondelet, though he never practiced medicine, or styled himself as a physician. He died in Leiden in the Netherlands in 1609, at the age of 83.

While little is known of his relationships, he formed many friendships, both male and female, and his extensive preserved correspondence throws considerable light on those friendships. His male friends were largely academic, with whom he corresponded in Latin, his female friends (at least 35 are known) predominantly collectors and horticulturalists with whom he corresponded in their vernacular, but treated all with the same respect. Unlike his male friends, who were from all over the world, his women friends were all in the Habsburg countries, especially the southern Netherlands and Austria.

== Work ==
In the 1560s Clusius was employed by the Fugger banking family as tutor to one of Anton Fugger's sons and as agent, including a plant collecting expedition to Spain, where he became familiar with plants introduced from the New World. In 1573, with the help of Ogier Ghiselin de Busbecq, he was appointed prefect (director) of the imperial medical garden in Vienna by Emperor Maximilian II (1564–1576) and made Gentleman of the Imperial Chamber. Busbecq, who had been ambassador to the Ottoman Empire (1554–1562) under the previous emperor, Ferdinand I (1558–1564), was a keen gardener and soon arranged for exotic bulbs to be sent from the court at Constantinople to the gardens in Vienna. Clusius was discharged from the imperial court shortly after the death of Maximilian and accession of his son Rudolf II (1576–1612) in 1576.

After leaving Vienna in the late 1580s, he established himself in Frankfurt am Main, before his appointment as professor at the University of Leiden in October 1593, where he also became the first praefectus (prefect) of the city's new botanical garden, the Hortus Academicus, associated with the university. There he helped to create one of the earliest formal botanical gardens of Europe and his detailed planting lists have made it possible to recreate his garden near where it originally lay. He was invited to join the Accademia dei Lincei as a corresponding member in 1604, but declined.

He traveled extensively throughout Europe, furthering his knowledge of plants. Clusius was among the first to study the flora of Austria, under the auspices of Maximilian II. He was the first botanist to climb the Ötscher and the Schneeberg in Lower Austria, which was also the first documented ascent of the latter. His illustrated works form an important chapter in sixteenth century natural history, producing a large body of drawing and watercolours. The latter, forming part of an important collection of late sixteenth century botanical illustration, the Libri picturati. (Note: The Libri picturati collection is held by the Jagiellonian Library of the Jagiellonian University in Kraków, Poland, but were originally in the former Preussischer Staatsbibliothek of Berlin) He was responsible for the cultivation of a number of plants, new to Europe, including the tulip, potato, and horse chestnut. Clusius was widely influential in European science and culture and his circle of correspondents included princes and aristocrats such as Wilhelm IV of Hessen-Kassel (1567–1592) and Princesse Marie de Brimeu, who was one of his most frequent correspondents.

=== Study of tulips ===
In the history of gardening he is remembered not only for his scholarship but also for his work on tulips. At Leiden, his cultivation of tulips in the botanic gardens there, laid the foundations of the Dutch tulip bulb industry. In particular his observations on tulip's "breaking" — a phenomenon discovered in the late 19th century to be due to a virus — causing the many different flamed and feathered varieties, which led to the speculative tulip mania of the 1630s. Clusius laid the foundations of Dutch tulip breeding and the bulb industry today.

=== Clusius' life and times ===
During Clusius' lifetime, botanical knowledge was undergoing enormous expansion, partly fueled by the expansion of the known plant world by New World exploration, and is thought of as a botanical Renaissance. Europe became engrossed with natural history from the 1530s, and gardening and cultivation of plants became a passion and prestigious pursuit from monarchs to universities. The first botanical gardens appeared as well as the first illustrated botanical encyclopaedias, together with thousands of watercolours and woodcuts. The experience of farmers, gardeners, foresters, apothecaries and physicians was being supplemented by the rise of the plant expert. Collecting became a discipline, specifically the Kunst- und Wunderkammern (cabinets of curiosities) outside of Italy and the study of naturalia became widespread through many social strata. The great botanists of the sixteenth century were all, like Clusius, originally trained as physicians, who pursued a knowledge of plants not just for medicinal properties, but in their own right. Chairs in botany, within medical faculties were being established in European universities throughout the sixteenth century in reaction to this trend, and the scientific approach of observation, documentation and experimentation was being applied to the study of plants.

Clusius' influence was a key factor in all these developments with his pioneering and influential publications, and introduction of hitherto unknown exotic plants to the Low Countries. As adviser to princes and aristocrats and central figure of a vast European network of exchange, he successfully transmitted his knowledge widely. He is considered one of the most eminent botanists of the European Renaissance, and his influence on tulip breeding continues to the present day.

=== Publications ===
His first publication was a French translation of Rembert Dodoens's herbal, "Histoire des Plantes", published in Antwerp in 1557 by van der Loë. His Antidotarium sive de exacta componendorum miscendorumque medicamentorum ratione ll. III ... nunc ex Ital. sermone Latini facti (1561) initiated his fruitful collaboration with the renowned Plantin printing press at Antwerp, which permitted him to issue late-breaking discoveries in natural history and to ornament his texts with elaborate engravings. Clusius, as he was known to his contemporaries, published two major original works: his Rariorum aliquot stirpium per Hispanias observatarum historia (1576)— is one of the earliest books on Spanish flora— and his Rariorum stirpium per Pannonias observatorum Historiae (1583) is the first book on Austrian and Hungarian alpine flora. (Note: The illustrations in the Rariorum aliquot stirpium per Hispanias observatarum historia were based on drawings made by Clusius himself and the Flemish artist Pieter van der Borcht, which were cut by the engraver Gerard van Kampen, and the originals of these drawings are collected in theLibri picturati A. 16-31)

Clusius' collected works were published in two parts: Rariorum plantarum historia (1601) contains his Spanish and Austrian flora and adds more information about new plants as well as a pioneering mycological study on mushrooms from Central Europe (as appendix: Fungorum in Pannoniis observatorum, covering toxic fungi in the section: "Fungi noxii et perniciosi"); and Exoticorum libri decem (1605) is an important survey of exotic flora and fauna, both still often consulted. His Rariorum plantarum, published in four books, is illustrated with many woodcuts of botanical specimens, and is indicative of the new interest in botany and botanical gardens which arose during the Renaissance. He contributed as well to Abraham Ortelius's map of Spain. Clusius translated several contemporary works in natural science.

Clusius' vast correspondence with his European contemporaries has been preserved at Leiden University Libraries and made available digitally by the Scaliger Institute there (The Clusius Project). The collection contains about 1,500 letters from 320 correspondents in six languages during the period 1560–1609.

==== List of selected publications ====
see Bibliography (2006)

- Dodoens, Rembert (1557) [1554]. Cruydeboeck [Histoire des plantes] (in French). trans. from Dutch, by Carolus Clusius. Antwerp: de l'Imprimerie de Iean Loë.
- 1567: Garcia de Orta, Aromatum et simplicium aliquot medicamentorum apud Indios nascentium historia: Latin translation from Portuguese
- 1574: Nicolás Monardes, De simplicibus medicamentis ex occidentali India delatis quorum in medicina usus est: Latin translation from Spanish
  - 1579: Revised edition under the title Simplicium medicamentorum ex novo orbe delatorum, quorum in medicina usus est, historia
- Clusius, Carolus (1576). Rariorum alioquot stirpium per Hispanias observatarum historia: libris duobus expressas. Antwerp: Christophori Plantini.
- 1582: Compendium of the translations from Garcia de Orta and Nicolás Monardes, now combined with selections from Cristóbal Acosta, Tractado de las drogas y medicinas de las Indias orientales
  - 1593: Further revised edition of this compendium
- Clusius, Carolus (1583). Rariorum aliquot stirpium, per Pannoniam, Austriam, & vicinas quasdam provincias observatarum historia, quatuor libris expressa ... . Antwerp: Christophori Plantini.
- Clusius, Carolus (1601). Rariorum plantarum historia: quae accesserint, proxima pagina docebit. Antwerp: Ioannem Moretum. (also at Botanicus: Rariorum plantarum )
- 1605: Exoticorum libri decem, including final revised editions of the translations from Garcia de Orta, Nicolás Monardes and Cristóvão da Costa
- Clusius, Carolus (1550–1595). "Kolekcja Clusiusa. Zwierzęta i rośliny (Libri picturati)". Jagiellonian Digital Library. Kraków: Jagiellonian Library.

==== Translations of his work ====
- 1589: Dell'historia dei semplici aromati et altre cose che vengono portare dall'Indie Orientali pertinente all'uso della medicina ... di Don Garzia dall'Horto. Italian re-translation by Annibale Briganti of Clusius's edited translations of Garcia de Orta and Nicolás Monardes
- "Some notes of Charles L`ecluse a native of Gaul Upon the history of spices by Garcia de Orta's Aromatum et Simplicium Historia", Translated by Reverend Martin Pollard, O.S.B., Edited and Introduction by Garry D. Gitzen, Fort Nehalem Publishing, Wheeler, Oregon (2009)
- Clusius, Carolus (1951). A Treatise on Tulips. Translated by W. van Dijk. Haarlem: Associated Bulb Growers of Holland. (Translation of a section from the Rariorum plantarum historia, 1601: see Clusius (1601))

== Legacy ==
Justus Lipsius called Clusius "the father of all the beautiful gardens in this country".

=== Eponomy ===
His contribution to the study of alpine plants has led to many of them being named in his honour, such as Gentiana clusii, Potentilla clusiana and Primula clusiana. The genus Clusia (whence the family Clusiaceae) also honours Clusius. His work formed an important step in the development of modern botany.

== See also ==
- Botanical gardens
- History of botany
- History of gardening

== Bibliography ==
=== Books ===
- Bethencourt, Francisco; Egmond, Florike, eds. (2007). Cultural Exchange in Early Modern Europe vol. 3: Correspondence and Cultural Exchange in Europe 1400–1700. Cambridge University Press. ISBN 978-0-521-84548-9.
- Conan, Michel, ed. (2005). Baroque garden cultures: emulation, sublimation, subversion. Washington, D.C.: Dumbarton Oaks Research Library and Collection. ISBN 978-0-88402-304-3.
- Dash, Mike (1999). Tulipomania: The Story Of The World's Most Coveted Flower & The Extraordinary Passions It Aroused. London: Orion Publishing Group. ISBN 978-1-78022-057-4.
- Egmond, Florike; Hoftijzer, Paul Gerardus; Visser, Robert Paul Willem, eds. (2007). Carolus Clusius: towards a cultural history of a Renaissance naturalist. Koninklijke Nederlandse Akademie van Wetenschappen. ISBN 9789069845067. PDF version Archived 2016-10-09 at the Wayback Machine
  - Review
- Egmond, Florike (2010). The World of Carolus Clusius: Natural History in the Making, 1550-1610. Pickering & Chatto. ISBN 9781317324218.
- Fischer, Hubertus; Remmert, Volker R.; Wolschke-Bulmahn, Joachim (2016). Gardens, Knowledge and the Sciences in the Early Modern Period. Birkhäuser. ISBN 978-3-319-26342-7.
- Hunger, Friedrich Wilhelm Tobias (1927–43). 'Charles de L'Escluse (Carolus Clusius) Nederlandsch kruidkundige, 1526–1609 2 vols (in Dutch). The Hague: M. Nijhoff.
- Koning, Jan de (2008). Drawn After Nature: The Complete Botanical Watercolours of the 16th-century Libri Picturati. KNNV. ISBN 978-90-5011-238-3.
- Lefèvre, Wolfgang; Renn, Jürgen; Schoepflin, Urs, eds. (2003). The Power of Images in Early Modern Science. Basel: Birkhäuser Basel. ISBN 9783034880992.
- Ogilvie, Brian W. (2008). The Science of Describing: Natural History in Renaissance Europe. University of Chicago Press. ISBN 978-0-226-62086-2.
- Pavord, Anna (1999). The Tulip. London: Bloomsbury Publishing. ISBN 0-7475-4296-1.
- Pavord, Anna (2005). The naming of names: the search for order in the world of plants. New York: Bloomsbury. ISBN 978-1-59691-071-3.
- Sachs, Julius von (1890) [1875]. "The Botanists of Germany and the Netherlands from Brunfels to Kaspar Bauhin. 1530–1623". Geschichte der Botanik vom 16. Jahrhundert bis 1860 [History of botany (1530-1860)]. translated by Henry E. F. Garnsey, revised by Isaac Bayley Balfour. Oxford: Oxford University Press. pp. 13–36. doi:10.5962/bhl.title.30585.
- Stafleu, Frans A.; Cowan, Richard S. (1976). "Clusius, Carolus". Taxonomic literature: a selective guide to botanical publications and collections with dates, commentaries and types. Vol. 1. A–G (2nd ed.). Utrecht: Bohn, Scheltema & Holkema. pp. 513–515. ISBN 9789031302246.

=== Chapters ===
- Lewis, Gillian. Clusius in Montpellier 1551–1554: A humanist education completed?. pp. 65–98., in Egmond et al (2007)
- Tomasi, Lucia Tongiorgi (2005). Gardens of knowledge and the République des Gens des Sciences. pp. 85–129. ISBN 9780884023043., in Conan (2005)

=== Articles and theses ===
- de Brouwer, Veerle (31 August 2017). "Clusius' female network". Pineapples, Labyrinths, and Butterflies: Female Collectors in the Dutch Golden Age (MA thesis). Department of Arts and Culture, Leiden University. pp. 12–16.
- Egmond, Florike (March 2007). "The Clusius Project: Carolus Clusius and Sixteenth-century Botany in the Context of the new Cultural History of Science". Berichte zur Wissenschaftsgeschichte. 30 (1): 66–68. doi:10.1002/bewi.200701259.
- Gelder, Esther van (2011). Tussen hof en keizerskroon: Carolus Clusius en de ontwikkeling van de botanie aan Midden-Europese hoven (1573-1593) [Between court and crown: Carolus Clusius and the development of botany in Central European courts] (PDF) (PhD thesis) (in Dutch). Leiden University Press. ISBN 9789087281311. (English abstract)
- Menéndez de Luarca, Luis Ramón-Laca (1997). "Las plantas vasculares de la Península Ibérica en la obra de Clusio: envíos de semillas de Sevilla a Leiden" [The vascular plants of the Iberian Península in Clusius's works: the seeds sent from Sevilla to Leiden] (PDF). Anales Jardín Botánico de Madrid (in Spanish). 55 (2): 419–427.
- Ommen, Kasper van, ed. (2009). "The Exotic World of Carolus Clusius (1526-1609): Catalogue of an exhibition on the quatercentenary of Clusius' death, 4 April 2009" (PDF). Kleine Publicaties van de Leidse Universiteitsbibliotheek. 80. Archived from the original (PDF) on 14 September 2017.

=== Websites ===
- Valauskas, Edward J. (August 2014). "Clusius, Fugger, Holy Roman Emperors, and American tubers in sixteenth-century Europe". Lenhardt Library. Chicago Botanic Garden. Archived from the original on 13 September 2017.
- "Charles Clusius (1526-1609) Rariorum plantarum historia 1601". Royal Collection Trust. March 2015.
- "Carolus Clusius and sixteenth-century botany in the context of the new cultural history of science". Research and results. NWO. 2017.

==== Leiden University ====
- "Scaliger Institute". Leiden University Library.
- "Clusius project". Scaliger Institute, Leiden University Library. 15 June 2010.
- "Bibliography of Clusius' work". Scaliger Institute, Leiden University Library. 25 Feb 2006.
- "Clusius Correspondence Online: Accessible through Leiden University Digital Special Collections" (PDF). Digital Special Collections. University of Leiden.
- "Hortus Botanicus Leiden". University of Leiden.
- "Clusius Correspondence: a digital edition-in-progress". Leiden: Hortus Botanicus, Leiden University. December 2015. Archived from the original on 15 September 2017.
  - Correspondence
