= Nicolás Monardes =

Spanish botanist of the 16th century

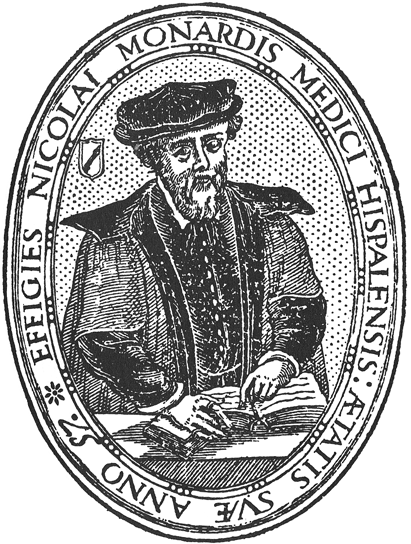
Nicolás Monardes

Nicolás Bautista Monardes (1493 – 10 October 1588) was a Spanish physician and botanist.

Monardes published several books of varying importance. In Diálogo llamado pharmacodilosis (1536), he examines humanism and suggests studying several classical authors, principally Pedanius Dioscorides.

He discusses the importance of Greek and Arab medicine in De Secanda Vena in pleuriti Inter Grecos et Arabes Concordia (1539).

De Rosa et partibus eius (1540) is about roses and citrus fruits. It is known that Monardes also believed that tobacco smoke was an infallible panacea.

Monardes' most significant and well known work was Historia medicinal de las cosas que se traen de nuestras Indias Occidentales, published in three parts under varying titles (in 1565, 1569 and completed in 1574; unchanged reprint in 1580). This was translated into Latin by Charles de l'Écluse and into English by John Frampton with the title "Joyfull Newes out of the newfound world".

== Background ==
Nicolás Monardes was born in Seville, Spanish Empire in 1493. He was the son of Nicoloso di Monardis, an Italian bookseller, and Ana de Alfaro, who was the daughter of a physician. Nicolás Monardes obtained a degree in art in 1530 and then in medicine three years later. After returning from his studies, Monardes began his practice of medicine in his hometown of Seville in 1533. Monardes later graduated from the University of Alcalá de Henares where he obtained his doctorate in medicine in 1547. He went on to marry Catalina Morales, who was the daughter of García Perez Morales, a professor of medicine at Seville. This connection to physicians on both sides of his family allowed Monardes to secure a good position in the world of medicine in Seville for the next fifty years. Monardes acquiring this high position in the medical world allowed him to get involved in the publishing of medical works with an emphasis on healing and medicine and trade with the colonies on the other side of the Atlantic. Monardes and Morales had seven children together. While some of Monardes’ children were able to travel to the Americas, Monardes himself was not able to accompany his offspring and had to learn about American drugs and herbs at the Seville docks. Eleven years after his wife died, Nicolás Monardes perished by way of a cerebral hemorrhage in 1588.

== Career ==
Monardes wrote books and reports that articulated the main characteristics of the empirical medicinal ideals of the Atlantic World. From these ideas came a series of books about the New World that provided arguments in favor of personal experience. This experiential culture can be illustrated with the events and people connected with Monardes’ book, Primera y Segunda y Tercera partes de la Historia medicinal de las cosas que se traen de nuestras Indias Occidentales que sirven en Medicina. He emphasized observation, testing practices, and realignment of classical traditions in his approach to medicine. While in Seville, he wrote about many of the new medicines and plants coming from the New World. He gathered information about these new herbs from soldiers, merchants, Franciscans, royal officials, and women. Many of Monardes’ works were translated to English. In 1577, John Frampton published his translation of Monardes’ book on medicines.

It's interesting to note that the historically impactful expedition of Francisco Hernandez to the New World may even be credited to Monardes’ inspiration. Some believe Monardes’ efforts sparked King Philip II of Spain to send Hernandez on his expedition. Like many other scientific researchers of the time, his works were commonly discussed and occasionally questioned. For instance, to test Monardes’ account of tobacco as a counter-poison, Philip II of Spain ordered one of his court physicians, Dr Berrnado, to try tobacco on a poisoned dog as an experiment. According to Monardes, the dog was saved.

== Monardes and tobacco ==
One of Monardes’ most well-known characteristics was his affinity for the tobacco plant. His fascination with the herb led him to believe that the crop had an incredible array of antidotal abilities. Monardes is known to assert that usage can cure over twenty conditions such as the common cold and, ironically, cancer. Tobacco went on to be used medicinally in Europe for some time. Many European doctors claimed the herb was essential for cures and for overall health and wellness. A devotee of Monardes’, Juan de Cardenas, echoed this sentiment by stating, “To seek to tell the virtues and greatness of this holy herb, the ailments which can be cured by it, and have been, the evils from which it has saved thousands would be to go on to infinity...this precious herb is so general a human need not only for the sick but for the healthy.” With many long-term users of the herb eventually showing degradation of health, tobacco’s harmful effects were recognized and discontinued as a mainstream European medicine.

== Medical publications ==
Monardes’ first four publications were written between 1536 and 1545. His first published work, a treatise on pharmacodilosis, was written in 1536. This publication’s focal point was on defending the classical medical tradition against the Arab medical tradition. His second publication was written in 1539 in regards to the relationship between blood-letting and cases of pleuritis. A third publication on the medical application of roses and an edition of a medical treatise written by Juan de Aviñón in the fourteenth century, were both written in 1545. After these four, Monardes did not publish another work for twenty years. This twenty-year period was when Monardes’ focus shifted to the medicinal products of the Americas. It was this shift that led to his most important work; the Historia medicinal de las cosas que se traen de nuestras Indias Occidentales que sirven al uso de la medicina, which was published in Seville in three parts. Part I, published in 1565 and dedicated to the Archbishop of Seville, was divided into four main sections: resins, purgatives, remedies for morbus gallicus (syphilis), and Peruvian balsam and elaborates on the medical uses of these products. The success of the first publication in Historia medicinal resulted in many informants who brought Monardes different plants that had the ability to cure a local illness. These informants and their testimonies served as the basis for Part II. Published in 1571 and dedicated to Philip II, Part II included the addition of nearly another dozen medicinal products including those that could be extracted from animals such as armadillos, sharks, caymans, as well as many others. Part II also includes an extensive study on tobacco and three chapters elaborating on the uses of sassafras, carlo santo, and cebadilla. Other chapters were devoted to other less significant products and testimonies of informants. Part III of Historia medicinal, published in 1574 along with parts I and II and dedicated to Pope Gregory XIII, elaborated more deeply on the usefulness of the products discussed in the first two parts as well as adding a few new ones, most notably the bezoar stones. The complete work was re-issued in 1580 in Seville and was the final edition during Monardes’ life. The success of the Historia medicinal is attributed to its timeliness, credibility, the experience of Monardes, and its coherence and skill of exposition.

== Auction records ==
On September 17, 2009 Swann Galleries auctioned a third English edition of Joyfull Newes out of the New-Found Worlde, London, 1596, for $13,200—an auction record for the book.

== Legacy ==
The genus Monarda was named for him.

== Bibliography ==
- 1536: Diálogo llamado pharmacodilosis
- 1539: De Secanda Vena in pleuriti Inter Grecos et Arabes Concordia
- 1540: De Rosa et partibus eius
- 1565: Historia medicinal de las cosas que se traen de nuestras Indias Occidentales
- 1569: Dos libros, el uno que trata de todas las cosas que se traen de nuestras Indias Occidentales, que sirven al uso de la medicina, y el otro que trata de la piedra bezaar, y de la yerva escuerçonera. Sevilla: Hernando Diaz
- 1571: Segunda parte del libro des las cosas que se traen de nuestras Indias Occidentales, que sirven al uso de la medicina; do se trata del tabaco, y de la sassafras, y del carlo sancto, y de otras muchas yervas y plantas, simientes, y licores que agora nuevamente han venido de aqulellas partes, de grandes virtudes y maravillosos effectos. Sevilla: Alonso Escrivano, 1571
- 1574: Primera y segunda y tercera partes de la historia medicinal de las cosas que se traen de nuestras Indias Occidentales, que sirven en medicina; Tratado de la piedra bezaar, y dela yerva escuerçonera; Dialogo de las grandezas del hierro, y de sus virtudes medicinales; Tratado de la nieve, y del beuer frio. Sevilla: Alonso Escrivano
- 1580: Reprint of the 1574 publication. Sevilla: Fernando Diaz

== Sources ==
- Boxer, C. R. (1963), Two pioneers of tropical medicine: Garcia d'Orta and Nicolás Monardes, London: Wellcome Historical Medical Library
- Guerra, Francisco (1961), Nicolás Bautista Monardes, su vida y su obra, ca. 1493-1588, Mexico
