= 1679 in science =

List of years in science	(table)
- … 1669; 1670; 1671; 1672; 1673; 1674; 1675; 1676; 1677; 1678; 1679; 1680; 1681; 1682; 1683; 1684; 1685; 1686; 1687; 1688; 1689 …
- Art; Archaeology; Architecture; Literature; Music; Philosophy; Science; +...

The year 1679 in science and technology involved some significant events.

== Botany ==
- Establishment of Hortus Botanicus (Amsterdam).

== Mathematics ==
- Samuel Morland publishes The Doctrine of Interest, both Simple & Compound, probably the first tables produced with the aid of a calculating machine.

== Medicine ==
- Great Plague of Vienna.
- Franciscus Sylvius' Opera Medica, published posthumously, recognizes scrofula and phthisis as forms of tuberculosis.

== Technology ==
- Pierre-Paul Riquet excavates Malpas Tunnel on the Canal du Midi in Hérault, France, Europe's first navigable canal tunnel (165 m, concrete lined).

== Zoology ==
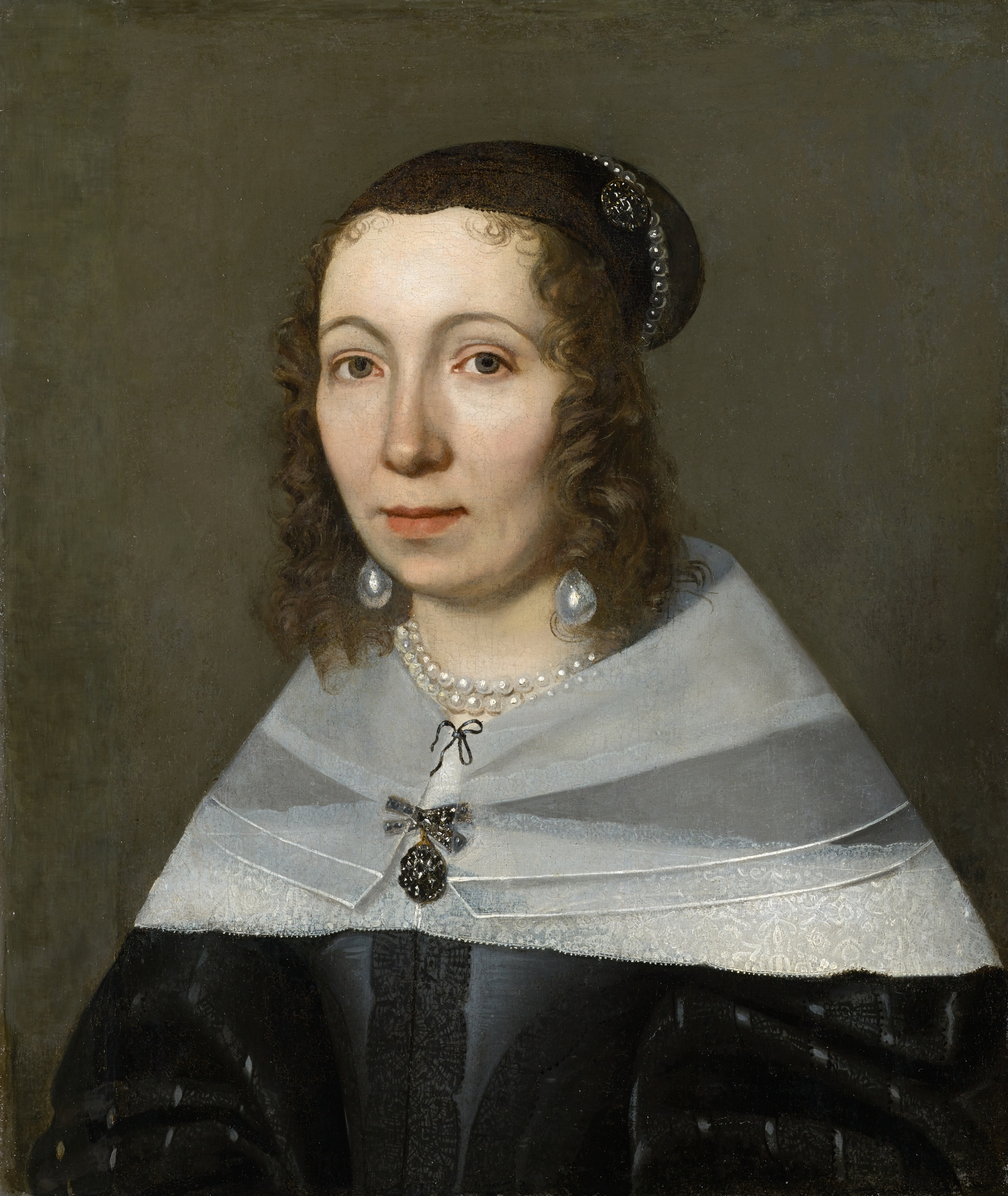
Maria Sibylla Merian in 1679

- Maria Sibylla Merian publishes the first part of Der Raupen wunderbare Verwandlung und sonderbare Blumennahrung ("The Caterpillars' Marvellous Transformation and Strange Floral Food"), comprising detailed illustrated descriptions of insect metamorphosis.

== Publications ==
- Publication in Paris of the first of Edme Mariotte's Essays de physique: De la végétation des plantes, a pioneering discussion of plant physiology; and De la nature de l'air, a statement of Boyle's law.
- Publication by the Paris Observatory of the world's first national ephemeris almanac, the Connaissance des tems, compiled by Jean Picard.

== Births ==
- January 2 – Pierre Fauchard, French physician (died 1761).
- January 24 – Christian Wolff, German philosopher, mathematician and scientist (died 1754)

== Deaths ==
- January 14 – Jacques de Billy, French Jesuit mathematician (born 1602)
