= 1676 in science =

List of years in science	(table)
- … 1666; 1667; 1668; 1669; 1670; 1671; 1672; 1673; 1674; 1675; 1676; 1677; 1678; 1679; 1680; 1681; 1682; 1683; 1684; 1685; 1686 …
- Art; Archaeology; Architecture; Literature; Music; Philosophy; Science; +...

The year 1676 in science and technology involved some significant events.

== Astronomy ==
- Summer – The Royal Greenwich Observatory, designed by Christopher Wren, is completed near London.
- December 7 – Danish astronomer Ole Rømer measures the speed of light by observing the eclipses of Jupiter's moons, obtaining a speed of 140,000 miles per second (approximately 25% too slow).
- Edmond Halley arrives on the island of Saint Helena, having left the University of Oxford, and sets up an astronomical observatory to catalogue stars from the Southern Hemisphere.

== Biology ==
- Antony Van Leeuwenhoek discovers bacteria, observed with the microscope.
- Francis Willughby's Ornithologiae is published by John Ray, the foundation of scientific ornithology.

== Medicine ==
- William Briggs publishes an anatomy of the eye (the first in England), Ophthalmographia, at Cambridge.
- Thomas Sydenham publishes the textbook Observationes mediciae, the enlarged 3rd edition of his Methodus curandi febres.

== Paleontology ==
- The first fossilised bone of what is now known to be a dinosaur is discovered in England by Robert Plot, the femur of a Megalosaurus from a limestone quarry at Cornwell near Chipping Norton, Oxfordshire.

== Physics ==
- Robert Hooke first reveals Hooke's law as a Latin anagram.

== Technology ==
- July 7 – The first clocks using a form of deadbeat escapement, constructed by Thomas Tompion to a design by Richard Towneley, are installed at the Royal Greenwich Observatory.

== Births ==
- May 28 – Jacopo Riccati, Italian mathematician (died 1754)
- Caleb Threlkeld, Irish botanist (died 1728)
- Maria Clara Eimmart, German astronomer, engraver and designer (died 1707)

== Deaths ==
- May 25 – Johann Rahn, Swiss mathematician (born 1622)
- September 4 – John Ogilby, English cartographer (born 1600)
