= 1678 in science =

List of years in science	(table)
- … 1668; 1669; 1670; 1671; 1672; 1673; 1674; 1675; 1676; 1677; 1678; 1679; 1680; 1681; 1682; 1683; 1684; 1685; 1686; 1687; 1688 …
- Art; Archaeology; Architecture; Literature; Music; Philosophy; Science; +...

The year 1678 in science and technology involved some significant events.

== Astronomy ==
- Edmund Halley publishes a catalogue of 341 southern stars—the first systematic southern sky survey.

== Physics ==
- Christiaan Huygens publishes his Traité de la Lumière/Treatise on Light, which states his principle of wavefront sources.
- Robert Hooke publishes in full Hooke's law, the fundamental law of elasticity: stress (force) exerted is proportional to the strain (elongation) produced (ut tensio, sic vis ("as the extension, so the force" or "the extension is proportional to the force")).

== Zoology ==
- Publication of English Spiders by Martin Lister, the first book devoted to spiders.

== Births ==
- April 14 – Abraham Darby I, ironmaster (died 1717)
- July 16 – Jakob Hermann, mathematician (died 1733)
- October 27 – Pierre Raymond de Montmort, mathematician (died 1719)
- November 26 – Jean-Jacques d'Ortous de Mairan, geophysicist (died 1771)
- December 2 – Nicolaas Kruik (Cruquius), cartographer and meteorologist (died 1754)
- unknown – Pierre Fauchard, physician and "father of modern dentistry" (died 1761)

== Deaths ==
- November 28 – Willem Piso, physician and naturalist (born 1611)
