= 1675 in science =

List of years in science	(table)
- … 1665; 1666; 1667; 1668; 1669; 1670; 1671; 1672; 1673; 1674; 1675; 1676; 1677; 1678; 1679; 1680; 1681; 1682; 1683; 1684; 1685 …
- Art; Archaeology; Architecture; Literature; Music; Philosophy; Science; +...

The year 1675 in science and technology involved some significant events.

== Astronomy ==
- March 4 – John Flamsteed appointed as "astronomical observator", in effect, the first Astronomer Royal of England.
- August 10 – King Charles II of England places the foundation stone of the Royal Greenwich Observatory near London.
- Giovanni Cassini discovers the Cassini Division in the rings of Saturn.

== Exploration ==
- April – The Antarctic Convergence is first crossed by English merchant Anthony de la Roché, who lands on South Georgia.

== Mathematics ==
- October 29 – German polymath Gottfried Leibniz makes the first use of the long s (∫) as a symbol of the integral in calculus.
- November 11 – Leibniz uses infinitesimal calculus for the first time to find the area under the graph of the function y=f(x).

== Physiology and medicine ==
- Antonie van Leeuwenhoek begins to use a microscope for observing human tissues and liquids.

== Technology ==
- February 25 – Netherlands scientist Christiaan Huygens files drawings of his invention of the balance spring, the key component to the accuracy of portable clocks and pocket watches, in a letter to the Journal des Sçavants.

== Births ==
- February 28 – Guillaume Delisle, French cartographer (died 1726)

== Deaths ==
- October – James Gregory, Scottish mathematician and astronomer (born 1638)
- October 27 – Gilles de Roberval, French mathematician (born 1602)
- November 11 – Thomas Willis, English physician (born 1621)
- approx. date – John Jonston, Polish naturalist and physician (born 1603)
