= 1680 in science =

| List of years in science | (table) |
- … 1670; 1671; 1672; 1673; 1674; 1675; 1676; 1677; 1678; 1679; 1680; 1681; 1682; 1683; 1684; 1685; 1686; 1687; 1688; 1689; 1690 …
- Art; Archaeology; Architecture; Literature; Music; Philosophy; Science; +...

The year 1680 in science and technology involved some significant events.

== Astronomy ==
- 14 November NS – Great Comet of 1680 observed by Gottfried Kirch, the first comet discovered by telescope.

== Biology ==
- English comparative anatomist Edward Tyson publishes Phocæna, or The anatomy of a porpess, dissected at Gresham Colledge, concluding that the porpoise is a mammal.
- Robert Morison publishes Plantarum Historiae Universalis Oxoniensis, Pars Secunda, seu Herbarum Distributio Nova per Tabulas Cognationis et Affinitatis ex Libro Naturae observata et detecta, utilising his method of taxonomy.

== Chemistry ==
- 30 September – Robert Boyle reports to the Royal Society of London his manufacture of phosphorus. He uses it to ignite sulfur-tipped wooden splints, forerunners of the match.

== Physics ==
- 8 July – Robert Hooke observes the nodal patterns associated with the vibrations of glass plates.

== Deaths ==
- 17 February – Jan Swammerdam, Dutch naturalist, founder of both comparative anatomy and entomology (born 1637)
- 22 March – François Cureau de La Chambre, French physician (born 1630)
- Marie Meurdrac, French chemist and alchemist (born 1610)
