= 1667 in science =

List of years in science	(table)
- … 1657; 1658; 1659; 1660; 1661; 1662; 1663; 1664; 1665; 1666; 1667; 1668; 1669; 1670; 1671; 1672; 1673; 1674; 1675; 1676; 1677 …
- Art; Archaeology; Architecture; Literature; Music; Philosophy; Science; +...

The year 1667 in science and technology involved some significant events.

== Astronomy ==
- June 24 – The site of the Paris Observatory is located on the Paris Meridian.

== Chemistry ==
- Johann Joachim Becher originates what will become known as phlogiston theory in his Physical Education.

== History and philosophy of science ==
- Thomas Sprat publishes The History of the Royal-Society of London, for the Improving of Natural Knowledge.

== Mathematics ==
- James Gregory demonstrates the transcendence of π.

== Physiology and medicine ==
- June 15 – Jean-Baptiste Denys performs the first blood transfusion from a lamb into a boy.
- Robert Hooke demonstrates that the alteration of the blood in the lungs is essential for respiration.
- Thomas Willis publishes Pathologicae Cerebri, et nervosi generis specimen.

== Publications ==
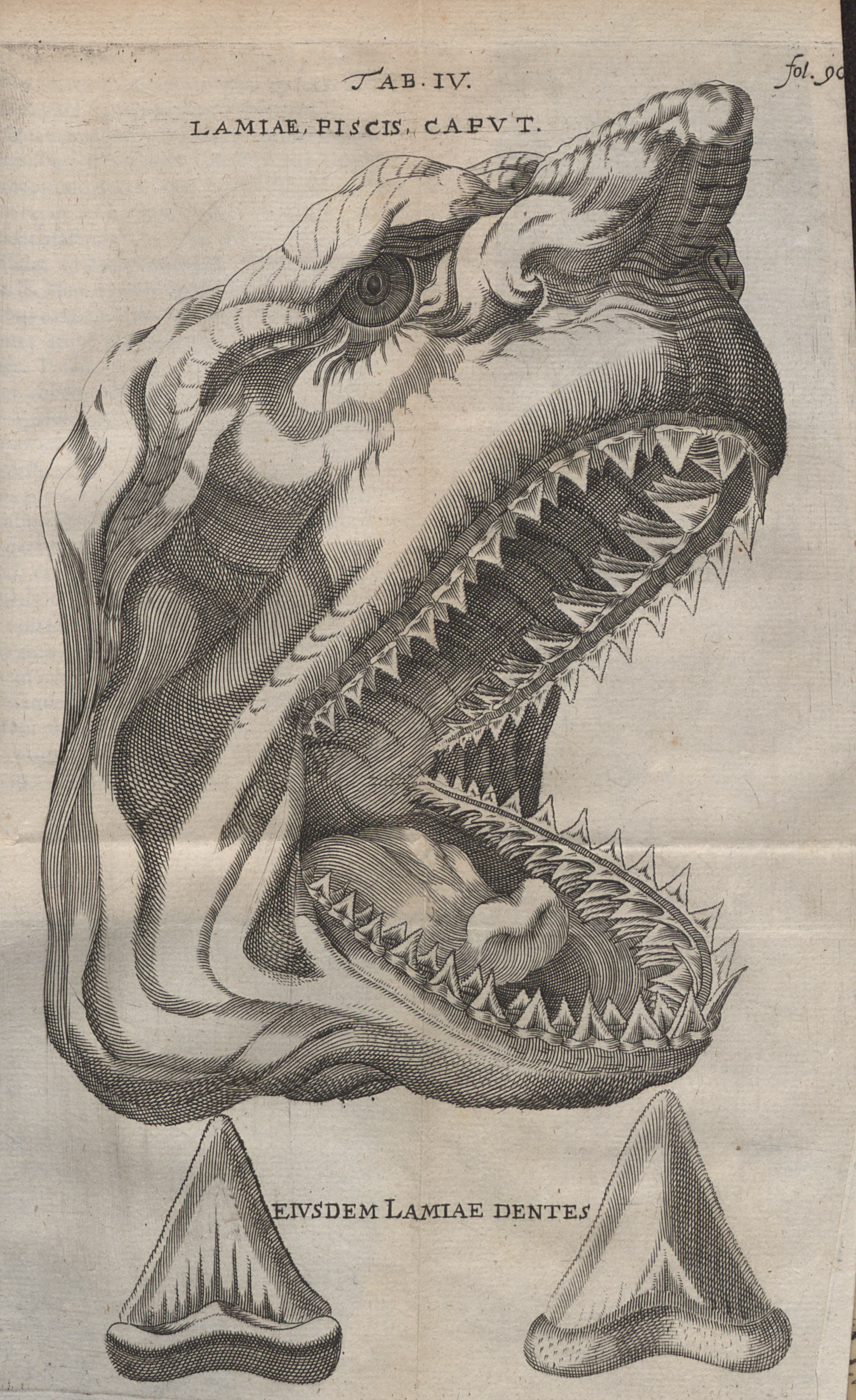
Elementorum myologiae specimen, 1669

- Nicolas Steno publishes Elementorum Myologiae Specimen, seu Musculi Descriptio Geometrica. Cui accedunt canis carchariae dissectum caput, et dissectus piscis ex canum genere in Florence, providing a foundation for the study of muscle mechanics, the ovary (based on his dissection of dogfish), and the sedimentary theory of geology.

== Births ==
- April 29 (bapt.) – John Arbuthnot, Scottish-born polymath (died 1735)
- May 2 – Jacob Christoph Le Blon, German inventor of four-colour printing (died 1741)
- May 26 – Abraham de Moivre, French mathematician (died 1754)
- July 27 – Johann Bernoulli, Swiss mathematician (died 1748)

== Deaths ==
- April 3 – Edward Somerset, 2nd Marquess of Worcester, English inventor (born 1601?)
- April 10 – Jan Marek Marci, Bohemian physician (born 1595)
- June 5 – Grégoire de Saint-Vincent, Flemish mathematician (born 1584)
- probable date – Peter Mundy, English traveller (born c. 1596)
