= 1677 in science =

List of years in science	(table)
- … 1667; 1668; 1669; 1670; 1671; 1672; 1673; 1674; 1675; 1676; 1677; 1678; 1679; 1680; 1681; 1682; 1683; 1684; 1685; 1686; 1687 …
- Art; Archaeology; Architecture; Literature; Music; Philosophy; Science; +...

The year 1677 in science and technology involved some significant events.

== Astronomy ==
- Publication of the first English star atlas, John Seller's Atlas Coelestis.

== Mathematics ==
- Gottfried Wilhelm Leibniz gives a complete solution to the tangent problem.
- Publication of Cocker's Arithmetick: Being a Plain and Familiar Method Suitable to the Meanest Capacity for the Full Understanding of That Incomparable Art, As It Is Now Taught by the Ablest School-Masters in City and Country, attributed to Edward Cocker (died 1676). It will remain a standard grammar school textbook in England for more than 150 years.

== Medicine ==
- January 21 – A pamphlet on smallpox published in Boston becomes the first medical publication in the British colonies in North America.

== Microbiology ==
- Antonie van Leeuwenhoek discovers the spermatozoon.

== Paleontology ==
- Robert Plot publishes The Natural History of Oxford-shire, Being an Essay Toward the Natural History of England, in which he describes the fossilised femur of a human giant, now known to be from the dinosaur Megalosaurus.

== Births ==
- February 8 – Jacques Cassini, French astronomer (died 1756)
- September 17 – Stephen Hales, English physiologist and clergyman (died 1761)
- September 27 – Johann Gabriel Doppelmayr, German mathematician, astronomer and cartographer (died 1750)

== Deaths ==
- May 4 – Isaac Barrow, English mathematician (born 1630)
- May 23 (bur.) – John Kersey, English mathematician (born 1677)
- October 11 – Sir Cornelius Vermuyden, Dutch-born drainage engineer (born 1595).
- October 14 – Francis Glisson, English physician (born 1599?)
