= 1665 in science =

List of years in science	(table)
- … 1655; 1656; 1657; 1658; 1659; 1660; 1661; 1662; 1663; 1664; 1665; 1666; 1667; 1668; 1669; 1670; 1671; 1672; 1673; 1674; 1675 …
- Art; Archaeology; Architecture; Literature; Music; Philosophy; Science; +...

The year 1665 in science and technology involved some significant events.

== Events ==
- Summer – Isaac Newton graduates from the University of Cambridge which is then closed as a precaution against bubonic plague so he retires to his birthplace at Woolsthorpe-by-Colsterworth to develop his theories on calculus, optics and the law of gravitation.

== Astronomy ==
- Giovanni Cassini discovered Jupiter's red spot was a permanent feature and used this to measure Jupiter's period of rotation as 9 hours 56 minutes.

== Cartography ==
- Publication of the 'Atlas Maior' (Theatrum Orbis Terrarum) completed by Joan Blaeu in Amsterdam.

== Medicine ==
- April 12 – First recorded victim of the 'Great Plague of London' (1665–66), the last major outbreak of bubonic plague in the British Isles.

== Microbiology ==
- September – Robert Hooke's Micrographia published, first applying the term 'cell' to plant tissue, which he discovered first in cork, then in living organisms, using a microscope.

== Paleontology ==
- Athanasius Kircher in Mundus Subterraneus (publication of which begins in Amsterdam) describes giant bones as those belonging to extinct races of humans.

== Publications ==
- January 5 – The Journal des sçavans begins publication in France, the first scientific journal.
- March 6 – The Philosophical Transactions of the Royal Society of London begins publication in England under the editorship of Henry Oldenburg, the first scientific journal in English and the oldest to be continuously published.

== Births ==
- May 1 – John Woodward, English naturalist and physician (died 1728)
- approx. date – James Petiver, English naturalist and apothecary (died 1718)

== Deaths ==
- January 12 – Pierre de Fermat, French mathematician (born 1607)
- November 18 – Blaise Francois Pagan, French military engineer (born 1603)
