= 1681 in science =

List of years in science	(table)
- … 1671; 1672; 1673; 1674; 1675; 1676; 1677; 1678; 1679; 1680; 1681; 1682; 1683; 1684; 1685; 1686; 1687; 1688; 1689; 1690; 1691 …
- Art; Archaeology; Architecture; Literature; Music; Philosophy; Science; +...

The year 1681 in science and technology involved some significant events.

== Physiology and medicine ==
- November 29 – The Royal College of Physicians of Edinburgh is granted a royal charter.
- John Mayow gives the first known description of mitral stenosis.

== Technology ==
- May 15 – The Canal du Midi in France is opened officially as the Canal Royal de Languedoc.
- Samuel Morland demonstrates improvements in water pumps.
- First known reference to a corkscrew.

== Publications ==
- Thomas Burnet's cosmogony Telluris Theoria Sacra, or Sacred Theory of the Earth is published in England.
- Spanish Jesuit astronomer Eusebio Kino publishes his observations of the Great Comet of 1680 in Mexico City as Exposisión astronómica de el cometa, one of the earliest scientific treatises published by a European in the New World.

== Births ==
- August 12 – Vitus Bering, Danish-born Russian explorer (died 1741)

== Deaths ==
- Marie Fouquet, French medical writer (born 1590)
