= 1664 in science =

List of years in science	(table)
- … 1654; 1655; 1656; 1657; 1658; 1659; 1660; 1661; 1662; 1663; 1664; 1665; 1666; 1667; 1668; 1669; 1670; 1671; 1672; 1673; 1674 …
- Art; Archaeology; Architecture; Literature; Music; Philosophy; Science; +...

The year 1664 in science and technology involved some significant events.

== Astronomy ==
- May 9 – Robert Hooke discovers Jupiter's Great Red Spot.

== Biology ==
- Francesco Redi writes Osservazioni intorno alle vipere ("Observations about the Viper"), demonstrating that popular beliefs about venom are untrue.

== Mathematics ==
- January 18 – Isaac Barrow is appointed first Lucasian Professor of Mathematics at the University of Cambridge.
- Blaise Pascal's paper on the properties of the triangle is published posthumously.

== Medicine ==
- Thomas Willis publishes Cerebri Anatome, cui accessit nervorum descriptio et usus in London, including illustrations by Christopher Wren. This contains an accurate account of the nervous system and introduces the term "neurology".

== Births ==
- February 24 – Thomas Newcomen, English inventor (died 1729)
- September 22 – Catherine Jérémie, French-Canadian botanist (died 1744)

== Deaths ==
- July 11 (bur.) – Jan Janssonius, Dutch cartographer (born 1588)
- August 22 – Maria Cunitz, Silesian astronomer (born 1610)
