= 1671 in science =

List of years in science	(table)
- … 1661; 1662; 1663; 1664; 1665; 1666; 1667; 1668; 1669; 1670; 1671; 1672; 1673; 1674; 1675; 1676; 1677; 1678; 1679; 1680; 1681 …
- Art; Archaeology; Architecture; Literature; Music; Philosophy; Science; +...

The year 1671 in science and technology involved some significant events.

== Astronomy ==
- Completion of Paris Observatory, the world's first such national institution.
- February 27 – The Ortenau meteorite lands in Germany.
- October 25 – Italian-born French astronomer Giovanni Domenico Cassini discovers Iapetus, the second known moon of the planet Saturn.

== Mathematics ==
- James Gregory develops a series expansion for the inverse tangent function and discovers Taylor's theorem.
- Sawaguchi Kazuyuki (沢口 一之) publishes Kokin-Sanpo-Ki (古今算法之記), in which he gives the first comprehensive applied account of Chinese algebra in Japan.

== Medicine ==
- Publication of Les secrets de la medecine des Chinois, the first Western book on traditional Eastern medicine, in Grenoble.
- Publication of Jane Sharp's The Midwives Book: or the Whole Art of Midwifry Discovered, the first on the subject to be written by an Englishwoman.

== Physics ==
- Jacques Rohault publishes Traité de physique in Paris, disseminating Cartesian physics.

== Technology ==
- March 31 – The English Royal Navy launches HMS Royal James at Portsmouth Royal Dockyard, its first warship to have a frame reinforced by iron bars rather than an all wooden ship, an innovation by naval architect Anthony Deane.

== Births ==
- October 1 – Guido Grandi, Italian mathematician (died 1742)

== Deaths ==
- June 25 – Giovanni Battista Riccioli, Italian astronomer (born 1598)
