= 1660 in science =

List of years in science	(table)
- … 1650; 1651; 1652; 1653; 1654; 1655; 1656; 1657; 1658; 1659; 1660; 1661; 1662; 1663; 1664; 1665; 1666; 1667; 1668; 1669; 1670 …
- Art; Archaeology; Architecture; Literature; Music; Philosophy; Science; +...

The year 1660 in science and technology involved some significant events.

== Events ==
- November 28 – At Gresham College in London, twelve men, including Christopher Wren, Robert Boyle, John Wilkins and Robert Moray, meet after a lecture by Wren and resolve to found "a College for the Promoting of Physico-Mathematicall Experimentall Learning", which will become the Royal Society.

== Botany ==
- John Ray publishes Catalogus plantarum circa Cantabrigiam nascentium in Cambridge, the first flora of an English county.

== Mathematics ==
- The popular English-language edition by Isaac Barrow of Euclid's Elements is published in London.

== Physics ==
- Robert Boyle publishes New Experiments Physico-Mechanicall, Touching the Spring of the Air and its Effects (the second edition in 1662 will contain Boyle's law).
- Robert Hooke conceives Hooke's law (but does not publish it in full until 1678).

== Zoology ==
- Jan Goedart begins publication of Metamorphosis Naturalis in Middelburg, Zeeland, containing detailed illustrated descriptions of insect metamorphosis.

== Births ==
- February 19 – Friedrich Hoffmann, German physician and chemist (died 1742)
- April 16 – Hans Sloane, Ulster Scots-born collector and physician (died 1753)
- March 15 – Olof Rudbeck the Younger, Swedish naturalist (died 1740)
- May 27 (bapt.) – Francis Hauksbee, English scientific instrument maker and experimentalist (died 1713)
- approx. date – Edward Lhuyd, Welsh naturalist (died 1709)
- Date unknown – Jeanne Dumée, French astronomer (born 1660)

== Deaths ==
- May 29 – Frans van Schooten, Dutch Cartesian mathematician (born 1615)
- June 30 – William Oughtred, English mathematician who invented the slide rule (born 1574)
- Jean-Jacques Chifflet, French physician and antiquary (born 1588)
- Walter Rumsey, Welsh judge and amateur scientist (born 1584)
