= 1674 in science =

List of years in science	(table)
- … 1664; 1665; 1666; 1667; 1668; 1669; 1670; 1671; 1672; 1673; 1674; 1675; 1676; 1677; 1678; 1679; 1680; 1681; 1682; 1683; 1684 …
- Art; Archaeology; Architecture; Literature; Music; Philosophy; Science; +...

The year 1674 in science and technology involved some significant events.

== Biology ==
- Antonie van Leeuwenhoek discovers infusoria using the microscope.

== Pharmacology ==
- Thomas Willis publishes Pharmaceutice rationalis.

== Deaths ==
- Jean Pecquet, French anatomist (born 1622)
