= 1678 in literature =

List of years in literature	(table)
- … 1668; 1669; 1670; 1671; 1672; 1673; 1674; 1675; 1676; 1677; 1678; 1679; 1680; 1681; 1682; 1683; 1684; 1685; 1686; 1687; 1688 …
- Art; Archaeology; Architecture; Literature; Music; Philosophy; Science; +...

This article contains information about the literary events and publications of 1678.

== Events ==
- February – English dramatist Thomas Otway, perhaps escaping from an unhappy love affair with his leading actress, obtains a commission in an English regiment serving in the Franco-Dutch War and is sent in July to Flanders.
- February 18 – The first part of English nonconformist John Bunyan's Christian allegory The Pilgrim's Progress, partly written while he was imprisoned for unlicensed preaching, is published in London.
- March – The novel La Princesse de Clèves, presumed to be by Madame de La Fayette, is published in Paris. It is set in 1558–1559 and an early example of a psychological novel.
- November – The English printer Joseph Moxon becomes the first tradesman to be elected a Fellow of the Royal Society of London.

== New books ==
=== Prose ===
- Manuel Ambrosio de Filguera – Si sea lícito hacer los autos sacramentales en las iglesias
- John Barret – The Christian Temper, or, A Discourse Concerning the Nature and Properties of the Graces of Sanctification
- Jacob Boehme – Mysterium Magnum, oder Erkärung über das Erste Buch Mosis (Amsterdam & Frankfurt; contains a portrait of Boehme by N. van Werd)
- John Bunyan – The Pilgrim's Progress
- Ralph Cudworth – The True Intellectual System of the Universe
- Madame de La Fayette (anonymously) – La Princesse de Clèves
- Sir Thomas Herbert – Threnodia Carolina
- Thomas Hobbes – Decameron Physiologicum
- Josiah King – The Examination and Trial of Old Father Christmas Together with his Clearing by the Jury
- The Mowing-Devil: or, Strange News out of Hartford-Shire (a woodcut showing what is alleged to be the first crop circle)
- The Works of Geber, Englished by Richard Russell.
- Thomas Rymer – The Tragedies of the Last Age Considered
- Jacob Spon – Voyage d'Italie, de Dalmatie, de Grèce et du Levant
- Aernout van Overbeke – De rym-wercken

=== Drama ===
- Anonymous
  - Actio Curiosa
- John Banks – The Destruction of Troy
- Aphra Behn – Sir Patient Fancy
- William Chamberlayne – Wits Led by the Nose, or a Poet's Revenge published
- Thomas Corneille – Le Comte d'Essex
- John Dryden
  - All for Love
  - The Kind Keeper
- Thomas d'Urfey
  - Trick for Trick
  - Squire Oldsapp
- Edward Howard – The Man of Newmarket
- Nathaniel Lee – Mithridates, King of Pontus
- John Leanerd
  - The Counterfeits
  - The Rambling Justice
- Thomas Otway – Friendship in Fashion
- Samuel Pordage – The Siege of Babylon
- Edward Ravenscroft – The English Lawyer (adapted from George Ruggle's Latin play Ignoramus)
- Thomas Rawlins – Tunbridge Wells
  - Titus Andronicus, or the Rape of Lavinia (adapted from Shakespeare's play)
- Thomas Shadwell
  - The History of Timon of Athens the Man-Hater
  - A True Widow
- Nahum Tate – Brutus of Alba

=== Poetry ===
- Anne Bradstreet – Several Poems Compiled with Great Variety of Wit and Learning (posthumously published)
- Samuel Butler – Hudibras, Part 3
- Dorthe Engelbrechtsdatter – Själens aandelige Sangoffer ("The Souls Spiritual Offering of Song")

== Births ==
- January 10 – Paul Gabriel Antoine, French theologian (died 1743)
- July – Thomas Hearne, editor of medieval manuscripts (died 1735)
- December 14 – Daniel Neal, English historian (died 1743)
- Unknown dates
  - Thomas Sherlock, English religious writer and bishop (died 1761)
  - William Wogan, Welsh religious writer in English (died 1758)

== Deaths ==
- January 16 – Madeleine de Souvré, marquise de Sablé, French writer and salonnière (born 1599)
- March 10 – Jean de Launoy, French historian (born 1603)
- April 12 – Sir Thomas Stanley, English poet, writer and translator (born 1625)
- May 4 – Abraham Woodhead, English Catholic writer (born 1609)
- May 14 or 15 – Anna Maria van Schurman, Dutch poet and scholar (born 1607)
- August 16 – Andrew Marvell, English poet and politician (born 1621)
- August 17 – Guillaume Herincx, Netherlandish theologian (born 1621)
- November 21 – Robert Thoroton, English antiquary (born 1623)
- Unknown date – Theophilus Gale, English theologian (born 1628)
- Probable date – Richard Flecknoe English dramatist and poet (born c. 1600)
