= 1656 in science =

List of years in science	(table)
- … 1646; 1647; 1648; 1649; 1650; 1651; 1652; 1653; 1654; 1655; 1656; 1657; 1658; 1659; 1660; 1661; 1662; 1663; 1664; 1665; 1666 …
- Art; Archaeology; Architecture; Literature; Music; Philosophy; Science; +...

The year 1656 in science and technology involved some significant events.

== Astronomy ==
- Christiaan Huygens discovers that Saturn's planetary rings consist of rocks.

== Botany ==
- Publication in Vienna of Michał Boym's Flora Sinensis, the first book that uses the name "Flora" in this meaning, a book covering the plant world of a region (in this case, China).

== Medicine ==
- Louis XIV commissions the architect Libéral Bruant to build the Hospice de la Salpêtrière hospital in Paris.
- Physician Samuel Stockhausen of the metal mining town of Goslar in Lower Saxony publishes his Libellus de lithargyrii fumo noxio morbifico, ejusque metallico frequentiori morbo vulgò dicto die Hütten Katze oder Hütten Rauch ("Treatise on the Noxious Fumes of Litharge, Diseases caused by them and Miners' Asthma"), a pioneering study of occupational disease.

== Technology ==
- December 25 – Christiaan Huygens designs the first working pendulum clock, which is sufficiently accurate to be fitted with both a minute hand and a second hand.

== Publications ==
- Thomas Willis publishes De Fermentatione.

== Births ==
- June 5 – Joseph Pitton de Tournefort, French botanist (died 1708)
- October 29 (Julian calendar) – Edmond Halley, English astronomer (died 1742)

== Deaths ==
- April 24 – Thomas Fincke, Danish mathematician (born 1561)
- November 6 – Jean-Baptiste Morin, French mathematician, astronomer and astrologer (born 1583)
