= 1655 in science =

List of years in science	(table)
- … 1645; 1646; 1647; 1648; 1649; 1650; 1651; 1652; 1653; 1654; 1655; 1656; 1657; 1658; 1659; 1660; 1661; 1662; 1663; 1664; 1665 …
- Art; Archaeology; Architecture; Literature; Music; Philosophy; Science; +...

The year 1655 in science and technology involved some significant events.

== Astronomy ==
- March 25 – Titan, Saturn's largest moon, is discovered by Christiaan Huygens.

== Biology ==
- Botanical garden established at Uppsala University.
- Thomas Muffet's Healths Improvement, or, Rules comprising and discovering the nature, method, and manner of preparing all sorts of food used in this nation is published posthumously in England, containing, inter alia, descriptions of a wide range of wildfowl to be found in the country.

== Mathematics ==
- John Wallis introduces the symbol ∞ to represent infinity.

== Births ==
- January 6 (27 December 1654 OS) – Jacob Bernoulli, Swiss mathematician (died 1705)
- September 10 – Caspar Bartholin the Younger, Danish anatomist (died 1738)

== Deaths ==
- February 1 – Giovanni Baptista Ferrari, Italian Jesuit botanist and linguist (born 1584)
- October 16 – Rabbi Joseph Solomon Delmedigo, Cretan-born peripatetic physician and scientist (born 1591)
- October 24 – Pierre Gassendi, French physicist who played a crucial role in the revival of atomism (born 1592)
- Francesco Pona, Veronese physician and poet (born 1595)
