= 1680s in archaeology =

List of years in archaeology	(table)
- … 1670; 1671; 1672; 1673; 1674; 1675; 1676; 1677; 1678; 1679; 1680; 1681; 1682; 1683; 1684; 1685; 1686; 1687; 1688; 1689; 1690 …
- In science 1677 1678 1679 1680 1681 1682 1683
- Art; Archaeology; Architecture; Literature; Music; Philosophy; Science; +...

The decade of the 1680s in archaeology involved some significant events.

== Excavations ==
- 1685: Dolmen at Borger, Netherlands, excavated by Titia Brongersma.

== Publications ==
- 1685: Jacob Spon - Miscellanea eruditae antiquitatis

== Events ==
- 1683: June 6 - The Ashmolean Museum opens in Oxford. The Rev. Robert Huntington donates the limestone false door stele of Shery from Saqqara (Fourth Dynasty of Egypt), one of the first large Middle Eastern sculptures seen in Western Europe.
- 1687: An explosion destroys part of the Parthenon.

== Births ==
- 1685: approximate date - John Horsley, English archaeologist (d. 1732)
- 1687: November 7 - William Stukeley, English antiquarian (d. 1765)

== Deaths ==
- 1680: November 28 - Athanasius Kircher, German scholar (b. 1602)
- 1689: November 26 - Marquard Gude, German archaeologist (b. 1635)

Preceded by 1670s in archaeology	Archaeology timeline 1680s	Succeeded by 1690s in archaeology
