= 1690s in archaeology =

List of years in archaeology	(table)
- … 1680; 1681; 1682; 1683; 1684; 1685; 1686; 1687; 1688; 1689; 1690; 1691; 1692; 1693; 1694; 1695; 1696; 1697; 1698; 1699; 1700 …
- In science 1687 1688 1689 1690 1691 1692 1693
- Art; Archaeology; Architecture; Literature; Music; Philosophy; Science; +...

The decade of the 1690s in archaeology involved some significant events.

== Finds ==
- 1693 - Alfred Jewel discovered at North Petherton in Somerset, England.
- 1697 - Commemorative stela of Nahr el-Kalb discovered in Lebanon by Henry Maundrell.

== Events ==
- 1693 - John Aubrey completes his Monumenta Britannica, or, A miscellanie of British antiquities in manuscript.
- 1694 - Maltese canon Ignazio di Costanzo reports in a letter that the Cippi of Melqart bear an inscription in the Phoenician alphabet.

== Births ==
- 1690: February 3 - Richard Rawlinson, English antiquarian (d. 1755)
- 1692: October 31 - Anne Claude de Caylus, French archaeologist (d. 1765)
- 1696: Francis Drake, English antiquary (d. 1771)

== Deaths ==
- 1697: John Aubrey, English antiquary (b. 1626)
- 1698: Giovanni Giustino Ciampini, Italian archaeologist (b. 1633)

Preceded by 1680s in archaeology	Archaeology timeline 1690s	Succeeded by 1700s in archaeology
