= 1677 in literature =

List of years in literature	(table)
- … 1667; 1668; 1669; 1670; 1671; 1672; 1673; 1674; 1675; 1676; 1677; 1678; 1679; 1680; 1681; 1682; 1683; 1684; 1685; 1686; 1687 …
- Art; Archaeology; Architecture; Literature; Music; Philosophy; Science; +...

This article contains information about the literary events and publications of 1677.

== Events ==
- January 1 – Jean Racine's tragedy Phèdre is first performed, at the Hôtel de Bourgogne (theatre) in Paris.
- February
  - Nathaniel Lee's blank verse tragedy The Rival Queens, or the Death of Alexander the Great is performed at the Theatre Royal, Drury Lane, London, with Mrs. Charlotte Melmoth as Roxana.
  - Thomas Killigrew, ineffective after four years as Master of the Revels, is replaced by his son Charles.
- September – Edward Ravenscroft's tragicomedy King Edgar and Alfreda, on the subject of King Edgar of England. Thomas Rymer's less successful play on the same subject is published in 1678.
- date unknown
  - Roger Morrice begins his Entring Book, a manual diary describing society in the period 1677 to 1691.
  - Froinsias Ó Maolmhuaidh's Grammatica Latino-Hibernica nunc compendiata, the first printed grammar of the Irish language (in Latin), is published by the Congregation of Propaganda Fide in Rome in the year of his death.

== New books ==
=== Prose ===
- Roger Boyle, 1st Earl of Orrery – Treatise of the Art of War
- Edward Cocker – Cocker's Arithmetick
- Christian Knorr von Rosenroth – Kabbala Denudata (publication starts)
- John Mason – Major Mason's Brief History of the Pequot War
- John Milton – The History of Britain
- Francis North, 1st Baron Guilford – A Philosophical Essay of Music
- Eirenaeus Philalethes – An Exposition upon Sir George Ripley's Vision.
- Baruch Spinoza – Opera Posthuma (with first known publication of his Ethics)
- Fabian Stedman – Tintinnalogia, or, the Art of Ringing

=== Drama ===
- John Banks – The Rival Kings (adapted from la Calprenède's Cassandre)
- Aphra Behn
  - The Rover
  - The Counterfeit Bridegroom
  - The Debauchee (adapted from Richard Brome's A Mad Couple Well-Match'd)
- Thomas Betterton – The Counterfeit Bridegroom
- William Cavendish, Duke of Newcastle – The Humorous Lovers and The Triumphant Widow published
- John Crowne – The Destruction of Jerusalem by Titus Vespasian, Parts 1 and 2
- Charles Davenant – Circe (a "semi-opera" with music by John Banister)
- Thomas d'Urfey – A Fond Husband
- John Leanerd – The Country Innocence
- Nathaniel Lee – The Rival Queens
- Thomas Otway
  - The Cheats of Scapin (adapted from Molière's Fourberies de Scapin)
  - Titus and Berenice (adapted from Racine's Bérénice)
- Samuel Pordage – The Siege of Babylon
- Thomas Porter – The French Conjuror
- Jean Racine – Phèdre
- Edward Ravenscroft
  - King Edgar and Alfreda
  - Scaramouch a Philosopher, Harlequin a Schoolboy, Bravo a Merchant and Magician
- Thomas Rymer – Edgar, or the English Monarch
- Pedro Calderon de la Barca
  - Amar después de la muerte o El Tuzaní de la Alpujarra
  - Parte I de autos sacramentales, alegóricos e historiales

=== Poetry ===
- Roger Boyle, 1st Earl of Orrery – On the Death of Abraham Cowley

== Births ==
- August 23 – Marie Anne Doublet, French scholar, writer and salonnière (died 1771)
- August 25 – Jean-Joseph Languet de Gergy, French theologian (died 1753)
- Unknown date – Elizabeth, Lady Wardlaw, English ballad writer (born 1727)
- Probable date – George Farquhar, Irish-born dramatist (died 1707)

== Deaths ==
- February 21 – Baruch Spinoza, Dutch philosopher (born 1632)
- May 24 – Anders Bording, Danish poet and journalist (born 1619)
- June 18 – Johann Franck, German poet, hymnist and politician (born 1618)
- June 24 – Dudley North, English poet, writer and politician (born 1602)
- July 9 – Angelus Silesius (Johann Scheffler), German poet and mystic (born 1624)
- September 5 – Henry Oldenburg, German-born theologian and natural philosopher (born c. 1619)
- September 11 – James Harrington, English political theorist (born 1611)
- October 14 – Francis Glisson, English medical writer and physician (born 1597)
- December 24 – Jacques de Coras, French poet (born 1630)
