= 1748 in science =

The year 1748 in science and technology involved some significant events.

== Archaeology ==
- Rediscovery of the ruins of Pompeii.

== Chemistry ==
- Thomas Frye of the Bow porcelain factory in London produces bone china.

== Earth sciences ==
- Publication in Amsterdam of the Neptunian theory of French diplomat Benoît de Maillet (died 1738) in Telliamed, ou entretiens d’un philosophe indien avec un missionnaire françois, sur la diminution de la mer, la formation de la terre, l’origine de l’homme... as edited by Abbé Jean Baptiste de Mascrier.

== Mathematics ==
- Leonhard Euler publishes Introductio in analysin infinitorum, an introduction to pure analytical mathematics, in Berlin. He calculates the mathematical constant e to 23 digits and presents Euler's formula. Euler's fifth paper on nautical topics, E137, is also written in this year but not published until 1750.
- Maria Agnesi publishes Instituzioni analitiche ad uso della gioventù italiana in Milan, "regarded as the best introduction extant to the works of Euler".
- approx. date – Thomas Bayes originates Bayes' theorem.

== Medicine ==
- John Fothergill publishes Account of the Sore Throat, attended with Ulcers, an early description of diphtheria.

== Technology ==
- Pierre Le Roy invents the detent escapement in watchmaking.
- Lewis Paul invents a hand machine for wool-carding.

== Publications ==
- Publication in Madrid of Jorge Juan and Antonio de Ulloa's Relación Histórica del Viage a la América Meridionale, including Ulloa's account of platinum.
- Publication of Man a Machine (L'homme Machine) by Julien Offray de La Mettrie.

== Awards ==
- Copley Medal: James Bradley
- Eva Ekeblad becomes the first female member of the Royal Swedish Academy of Sciences

== Births ==
- February 27 – Anders Sparrman, Swedish botanist (died 1820)
- March 5 – Jonas C. Dryander, Swedish botanist (died 1810)
- March 10 – John Playfair, Scottish scientist (died 1819)
- April 12 – Antoine Laurent de Jussieu, French botanist (died 1836)
- April 13 – Joseph Bramah, English inventor (died 1814)
- May 10 – Louis Pierre Vieillot, French ornithologist (died 1830)
- June 30 – Dominique, comte de Cassini, French astronomer (died 1845)
- August 8 – Johann Friedrich Gmelin, German naturalist (died 1804)
- December 9 – Claude Louis Berthollet, French chemist (died 1822)

== Deaths ==
- January 1 – Johann Bernoulli, Swiss mathematician (born 1667)
- November – Aleksei Chirikov, Russian explorer (born 1703)
- December 27 – Edmund Weaver, English astronomer (born c.1683)
