= 1681 in literature =

List of years in literature	(table)
- … 1671; 1672; 1673; 1674; 1675; 1676; 1677; 1678; 1679; 1680; 1681; 1682; 1683; 1684; 1685; 1686; 1687; 1688; 1689; 1690; 1691 …
- Art; Archaeology; Architecture; Literature; Music; Philosophy; Science; +...

This article contains information about the literary events and publications of 1681.

== Events ==
- Nahum Tate's play The History of King Lear, adapted from Shakespeare's King Lear with a happy ending is first published and first performed at the Duke's Theatre, London, with Thomas Betterton as Lear and Elizabeth Barry as Cordelia. It is so well received that it supplants Shakespeare's original in every performance given until 1838.
- The Impartial Protestant Mercury is launched in London, one of several periodicals of the century with similar names.

== New books ==
=== Prose ===
- Thomas Burnet – Telluris Theoria Sacra, or Sacred Theory of the Earth (Part 1 in Latin, Part 2 in 1689; in English 1684 and 1690)
- Chikkupadhyaya – Kamalachala Mahatmya
- Robert Knox – An Historical Relation of the Island Ceylon
- Anne Lefèvre – Anacreon and Sappho (translation)
- Hiob Ludolf – Historia Aethiopica
- William Penn – True Spiritual Liberty
- John Pordage – Treatise of Eternal Nature with Her Seven Essential Forms

=== Drama ===
- Aphra Behn
  - The False Count
  - The Roundheads
- John Crowne – Thyestes
- Thomas d'Urfey – Sir Barnaby Whigg
- Edward Ravenscroft – The London Cuckolds
- Thomas Shadwell – The Lancashire Witches (adapted from Brome and Heywood's The Late Lancashire Witches)
- Nahum Tate – adaptations from Shakespeare
  - The History of King Lear (from King Lear)
  - The Ingratitude of a Common-Wealth (from Coriolanus)
  - The Sicilian Usurper (from Richard II)
- Agustín Moreto – Parte III de comedias
- Antonio de Solís y Rivadeneyra – El amor al uso

=== Poetry ===
- Roger Boyle, 1st Earl of Orrery – Poems on Most of the Festivals of the Church
- John Dryden – Absalom and Achitophel (part 1)
- Andrew Marvell – Miscellaneous Poems (posthumous)

== Births ==
- March 18 – Esther Johnson, the "Stella" of Jonathan Swift (died 1728)
- July 12 – Abigail Williams, central character in Arthur Miller's 1953 play, The Crucible (died 1690s)
- November 17 – Pierre François le Courayer, Roman Catholic theologian (died 1776)

== Deaths ==
- January 16 – Olivier Patru, French legal historian and translator (born 1604)
- January 28 – Richard Allestree, English scholar and cleric (born 1621 or 1622)
- May 25 – Pedro Calderón de la Barca, Spanish dramatist and poet (born 1600)
- July 8 – Georg Neumark, German poet and hymn-writer (born 1621)
- September 17 – John Lacy, English playwright (born c. 1615)
- September 27 – Jacob Masen, German Jesuit writer (born 1606)
