= 1674 in literature =

| List of years in literature | (table) |
- … 1664; 1665; 1666; 1667; 1668; 1669; 1670; 1671; 1672; 1673; 1674; 1675; 1676; 1677; 1678; 1679; 1680; 1681; 1682; 1683; 1684 …
- Art; Archaeology; Architecture; Literature; Music; Philosophy; Science; +...

This article contains information about the literary events and publications of 1674.

== Events ==
- March 26 – The new Theatre Royal, Drury Lane opens in March. Designed by Christopher Wren, it replaces the original theatre that burned down in 1672.
- unknown dates
  - The poet Isaac de Benserade is elected to the French Academy, along with the churchman and scholar Pierre Daniel Huet.
  - Schlosstheater Celle is founded. By the 21st century it will be the oldest surviving theatre in Germany.
  - The derivative nature of Restoration drama is displayed when the Duke's Company produces Thomas Shadwell's "operatic" re-adaptation of Dryden and Davenant's 1667 adaptation of The Tempest. In response, their rivals at the King's Company stage The Mock Tempest, or the Enchanted Castle by Thomas Duffet.

== New books ==
=== Prose ===
- Samuel Chappuzeau – Le Théâtre François
- Charles Cotton – The Compleat Gamester
- John Evelyn – Navigation and Commerce
- John Josselyn – An Account of the Voyages to New England, London: Printed for Giles Widdows
- Thomas Ken – Manual of Prayers for the use of the Scholars of Winchester College
- Anthony Wood – Historia et antiquitates Universitatis Oxoniensis

=== Drama ===
- Anonymous (and John Dryden?) – The Mistaken Husband
- Juan Bautista Diamante – Parte II de comedias
- William Cavendish, Duke of Newcastle – The Triumphant Widow
- Pierre Corneille – Suréna
- John Crowne – Andromache
- Sir William Davenant – Macbeth, a "dramatic opera" adapted from Shakespeare's play, is published
- Thomas Duffet (attributed to) – The Amorous Old Woman
  - The Empress of Morocco: a Farce
  - The Mock Tempest
- Nathaniel Lee – The Tragedy of Nero, Emperour of Rome
- Jean Racine – Iphigénie
- Elkanah Settle – Love and Revenge

=== Poetry ===
- Thomas Flatman – Poems and Songs
- John Milton – Paradise Lost, second edition

== Births ==
- January 15 – Prosper Jolyot de Crébillon, French poet and dramatist (died 1762)
- June 20 – Nicholas Rowe (dramatist) English dramatist and Poet Laureate (died 1718)
- October – Thomas Ruddiman, Scottish classicist (died 1757)
- October 6 – Nicolas-Hubert de Mongault, French writer and cleric (died 1746)
- December – Christmas Samuel, Welsh writer and minister (died 1764)

== Deaths ==
- March 7 – Charles Sorel, sieur de Souvigny, French novelist (born 1602)
- June 14 – Marin le Roy de Gomberville, French poet and novelist (born 1600)
- August 13 – Lucidor (Lars Johansson), Swedish burlesque poet (born 1638; killed in duel)
- September 27
  - Robert Arnauld d'Andilly, French poet and translator (born 1589)
  - Thomas Traherne, English poet and religious writer (born c. 1636)
- October – Robert Herrick, English poet (born 1591)
- November 8 – John Milton, English poet and polemicist (born 1608)
- December 9 – Edward Hyde, 1st Earl of Clarendon English historian and statesman (born 1609)
- Unknown dates
  - Hu Zhengyan, Chinese artist, printmaker, calligrapher and publisher (born c. 1584)
  - James Janeway, English children's writer and Puritan minister (born 1636)
  - Miguel Sánchez, Mexican priest, writer and theologian (born 1594)
