= 1675 in literature =

List of years in literature	(table)
- … 1665; 1666; 1667; 1668; 1669; 1670; 1671; 1672; 1673; 1674; 1675; 1676; 1677; 1678; 1679; 1680; 1681; 1682; 1683; 1684; 1685 …
- Art; Archaeology; Architecture; Literature; Music; Philosophy; Science; +...

This article contains information about the literary events and publications of 1675.

== Events ==
- November 11 – Gottfried Leibniz's notebooks record a breakthrough in his work on calculus.

== New books ==
=== Prose ===
- Joshua Barnes – Gerania; a New Discovery of a Little Sort of People, anciently discoursed of, called Pygmies
- John Barret – Fifty Queries Seriously Propounded to those that Question or Deny Infants Right to Baptism
- Friderich Martens – Spitzbergische oder Groenlandische Reise-Beschreibung, gethan im Jahre 1671
- Edward Phillips – Theatrum poetarum
- A Satire Against Separatists, variously attributed to Abraham Cowley or Peter Hausted
- Philipp Jakob Spener – Pia Desideria
- Marie-Catherine de Villedieu – Les Désordres de l’amour
- John Wilkins – Of the Principle and Duties of Natural Religion
- Miguel de Molinos
  - Guía espiritual
  - Breve tratado de la comunión cotidiana
- Denis Vairasse – The History of the Sevarites or Sevarambi

=== Drama ===
- John Crowne
  - Calisto, or the Chaste Nymph (masque)
  - Country Wit
- John Dryden – Aureng-zebe
- Thomas Duffet – Psyche Debauch'd
- Sir Francis Fane – Love in the Dark
- Nathaniel Lee –
  - Nero, Emperor of Rome
  - Sophonisba
- Thomas Otway – Alcibiades
- Henry Nevil Payne – The Siege of Constantinople
- Thomas Shadwell – The Libertine
- William Wycherley – The Country Wife

=== Poetry ===
- John Wilmot, 2nd Earl of Rochester – A Satire Against Mankind (published 1679)

== Births ==
- February 26 (baptized) – Abel Evans, English clergyman, academic and poet (died 1737)
- September 2 – William Somervile, English poet (died 1742)
- October 11 – Samuel Clarke, English philosopher and cleric (died 1729)

== Deaths ==
- April 8 – Veit Erbermann, German theologian and controversialist (born 1597)
- September – Heinrich Müller, German devotional writer (born 1631)
- September 12 – Girolamo Graziani, Italian poet (born 1604)
- September 23 – Valentin Conrart, co-founder of French Academie (born 1603)
- November 11 – Thomas Willis, English physician and natural philosopher (born 1621)
- December 6 – John Lightfoot, English scholar and cleric (born 1602)
