= 1660s in archaeology =

List of years in archaeology	(table)
- … 1650; 1651; 1652; 1653; 1654; 1655; 1656; 1657; 1658; 1659; 1660; 1661; 1662; 1663; 1664; 1665; 1666; 1667; 1668; 1669; 1670 …
- In science 1657 1658 1659 1660 1661 1662 1663
- Art; Archaeology; Architecture; Literature; Music; Philosophy; Science; +...

The decade of the 1660s in archaeology involved some significant events.

== Finds ==
- 1661: Athanasius Kircher discovers the ruins of a church in Rome said to have been constructed by the Emperor Constantine on the site of Saint Eustace's vision (later reconstructed as the Santuario della Mentorella).
- 1667: The Capuan bust of Hannibal is found in Capua, Italy.
- 1669: One of a pair of gold sun-discs from ca. 2500–2150 BCE is found at Ballyshannon in Ireland.

== Events ==
- 1667: Henry Howard donates the first of the Arundel marbles to the University of Oxford (displayed in Ashmolean Museum).

== Births ==
- 1690: Edward Lhuyd, Welsh antiquary (d. 1709)

== Deaths ==
- 1661: Famiano Nardini, Italian archaeologist (b. c.1600)

Preceded by 1650s in archaeology	Archaeology timeline 1660s	Succeeded by 1670s in archaeology
