= 1718 in science =

This is a list of significant events that occurred in the year 1718 in science.

== Astronomy ==
- Edmond Halley discovers the proper motion of stars.

== Chemistry ==
- Étienne François Geoffroy presents the first ever table of chemical affinity (based on displacement reactions) to the French Academy of Sciences.

== Mathematics ==
- Abraham de Moivre publishes The Doctrine of Chances: a method of calculating the probabilities of events in play in English, which goes through several editions.

== Medicine ==
- The Charitable Infirmary, Dublin, is founded by six surgeons in Ireland, the first public voluntary hospital in the British Isles.

== Technology ==
- May 15 – James Puckle patents the Puckle Gun, in England.

== Births ==
- May 16 – Maria Gaetana Agnesi, Italian mathematician (died 1799)
- May 23 – William Hunter, Scottish anatomist (died 1783)
- August 17 – Francis Willis, English physician specialising in mental disorders (died 1807)
- Salomée Halpir (née Rusiecki), Lithuanian physician (died after 1763)

== Deaths ==
- March 11 – Guy-Crescent Fagon, French physician and botanist (born 1638)
- April – James Petiver, English naturalist and apothecary (born c. 1665)
- December 9 – Vincenzo Coronelli, Italian cartographer and encyclopedist (born 1650)
- December 11 – Pierre Dionis, French surgeon and anatomist (born 1643)
