= 1754 in science =

The year 1754 in science and technology involved some significant events.

== Astronomy ==
- Immanuel Kant, German philosopher, postulates retardation of Earth's orbit.

== Chemistry ==
- Joseph Black, Scottish chemist, discovers carbonic acid gas.

== Earth sciences ==
- Albert Brahms, Frisian Dijkgraaf, begins publication of Anfangsgründe der Deich und Wasser-Baukunst ("Principles of Dike and Aquatic Engineering") advocating scientific recording of tides.

== Mathematics ==
- Joshua Kirby publishes the pamphlet Dr. Brook Taylor's Method of Perspective made Easy both in Theory and Practice containing William Hogarth's Satire on False Perspective.
- Lagrange begins to work on the problem of tautochrone.

== Physics ==
- Václav Prokop Diviš, Czech theologian and natural scientist in the fields of applied electricity, develops a weather-machine. The same year, an electrical conductor devised by him is installed at the Vienna General Hospital.

== Botany ==
- John Lining published Of the anthelmintic virtues of the root of the Indian Pink, advocating for the potential of spigelia anthelmia as a vermifuge.

== Awards ==
- Copley Medal: William Lewis

== Births ==
- March 4 – Benjamin Waterhouse, American physician (died 1846)
- March 15 – Archibald Menzies, Scottish surgeon and botanist (died 1842)
- March 23 – Jurij Vega, Slovene mathematician, physicist and artillery officer (died 1802)
- May 6 – Thomas Coke, English agriculturalist and geneticist (died 1842)
- June 4 – Franz Xaver, Baron Von Zach, German astronomer (died 1832)
- August 21 – William Murdoch, Scottish engineer and inventor (died 1839)
- September 26 – Joseph Proust, French chemist (died 1826)

== Deaths ==
- February 5 – Nicolaas Kruik (Cruquius), Dutch cartographer and meteorologist (born 1678)
- February 16 – Richard Mead, English physician (born 1673)
- April 9 – Christian Wolff, German philosopher, mathematician and scientist (born 1679)
- April 15 – Jacopo Riccati, Italian mathematician (born 1676)
- November 27 – Abraham de Moivre, French mathematician (born 1667)
