= 1726 in science =

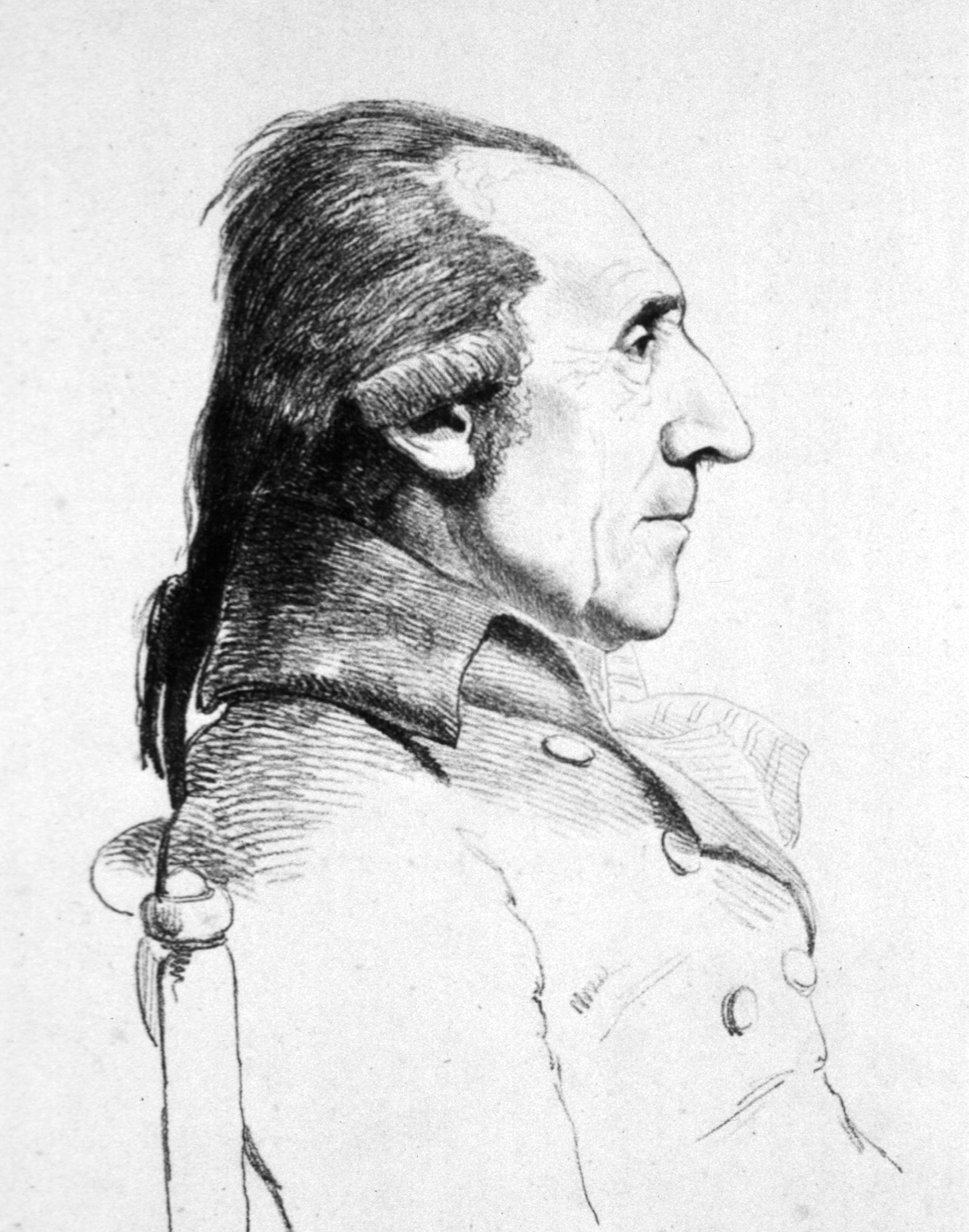
Russell Patrick (1726–1805), surgeon and herpetologis

The year 1726 in science and technology involved some significant events.

== Botany ==
- October 27 – Caleb Threlkeld publishes Synopsis Stirpium Hibernicarum .....Dispositarum sive Commentatio de Plantis Indigenis praesertim Dublinensibus instituta in Dublin, the first flora of Ireland.

== Medicine ==
- A faculty of medicine is formally established at the University of Edinburgh in Scotland, a predecessor of the University of Edinburgh Medical School. John Rutherford becomes Professor of Practice of Medicine.

== Technology ==
- For clocks, the gridiron pendulum is developed by English clockmaker John Harrison, as a pendulum that compensates for temperature errors: a grid of alternating brass and steel rods is arranged so that the expansion due to heat is dissipated.

== Publications ==
- Johann Beringer publishes Lithographiæ Wirceburgensis describing hoax fossils.

== Births ==
- February 6 – Patrick Russell, Scottish-born surgeon and herpetologist (died 1805)
- June 3 – James Hutton, Scottish geologist (died 1797)
- June 25 - Lady Anne Monson, English botanist (died 1776)
- Thomas Melvill, Scottish natural philosopher (died 1753)

== Deaths ==
- January 25 – Guillaume Delisle, French scientist, a founder of modern geography (born 1675)
