= 1731 in science =

The year 1731 in science and technology involved some significant events.

== Agriculture and horticulture ==
- Philip Miller publishes The Gardeners Dictionary, containing the Methods of Cultivating and Improving the Kitchen Fruit and Flower Garden in London.
- Jethro Tull publishes The New Horse-Houghing Husbandry; or, an essay on the principles of tillage and vegetation in London.

== Astronomy ==
- John Bevis observes the Crab Nebula for the first time in the modern era.
- The octant is developed by John Hadley (it will eventually be replaced as an essential tool of navigation by the sextant).
- The orrery (or planetarium model) is developed as an apparatus showing the relative positions of heavenly bodies in the Solar System by using balls moved by wheelwork.

== Geology ==
- The modern seismograph is developed by Italian scientist Nicholas Cerillo using a pendulum.

== Mathematics ==
- The Euclidean distance formula is first published by Alexis Clairaut.

== Medicine ==
- September – The first successful appendectomy is performed by English surgeon William Cookesley.
- Laura Bassi becomes the first official female university teacher on being appointed professor of anatomy at the University of Bologna at the age of 21.
- The Society for the Improvement of Medical Knowledge in Edinburgh begins publication of the peer reviewed Medical Essays and Observations.

== Technology ==
- The harpoon gun is developed and used for the purpose of throwing the harpoon into the body of whales.

== Publications ==
- Publication begins in Augsburg and Ulm of Johann Jakob Scheuchzer's Physica Sacra which attempts to provide a scientific explanation of Biblical history.

== Awards ==
- Copley Medal: The first Copley Medal is awarded to Stephen Gray.

== Births ==
- October 10 – Henry Cavendish, English scientist (died 1810)
- November 9 – Benjamin Banneker, African-American astronomer and surveyor (died 1806)
- December 12 – Erasmus Darwin, English physician and botanist (died 1802)

== Deaths ==
- January 6 – Étienne François Geoffroy, French chemist (born 1672)
- December 29 – Brook Taylor, English mathematician (born 1685)
