= 1740 in science =

The year 1740 in science and technology involved some significant events.

== Mathematics ==
- Jean Paul de Gua de Malves publishes his work of analytic geometry, Usages de l'analyse de Descartes pour découvrir, sans le secours du calcul differentiel, les propriétés, ou affections principales des lignes géométriques de tous les ordres [sic].

== Metallurgy ==
- Benjamin Huntsman develops the technique of crucible steel production at Handsworth, South Yorkshire, England.

== Physics ==
- Jacques-Barthélemy Micheli du Crest creates a spirit thermometer, making use of two fixed points, 0 for "Temperature of earth" based on a cave at Paris Observatory and 100 for the heat of boiling water.
- Émilie du Châtelet publishes Institutions de Physique, including a demonstration that the energy of a moving object is proportional to the square of its velocity (E_{k} = 1/2mv²).
- Louis Bertrand Castel publishes L'Optique des couleurs in Paris, including the observation that the colours of white light split by a prism depend on distance from the prism.

== Technology ==
- Henry Hindley of Yorkshire invents a device to cut the teeth of clock wheels.

== Awards ==
- Copley Medal: Alexander Stuart

== Births ==
- February 17 – Horace Bénédict de Saussure, Genevan pioneer of Alpine studies (died 1799)
- March 28 (bapt.) – James Small, Scottish inventor (died 1793)
- June 27 – John Latham, English physician and naturalist, "grandfather of Australian ornithology" (died 1837)
- July 1 – Franz-Joseph Müller von Reichenstein, Austrian mineralogist and discoverer of tellurium (died 1825)
- August 26 – Joseph Michel Montgolfier, French pioneer balloonist (died 1810)
- September 29 – Thomas Percival, English reforming physician and medical ethicist (died 1804)
- December 24 – Anders Johan Lexell, Finnish-Swedish astronomer and mathematician (died 1784)
- unknown – William Smellie, Scottish naturalist and encyclopedist (died 1795)

== Deaths ==
- March 23 – Olof Rudbeck the Younger, Swedish naturalist (born 1660).
