= Aernout van Overbeke =

Dutch writer and humorist (1632-1674)

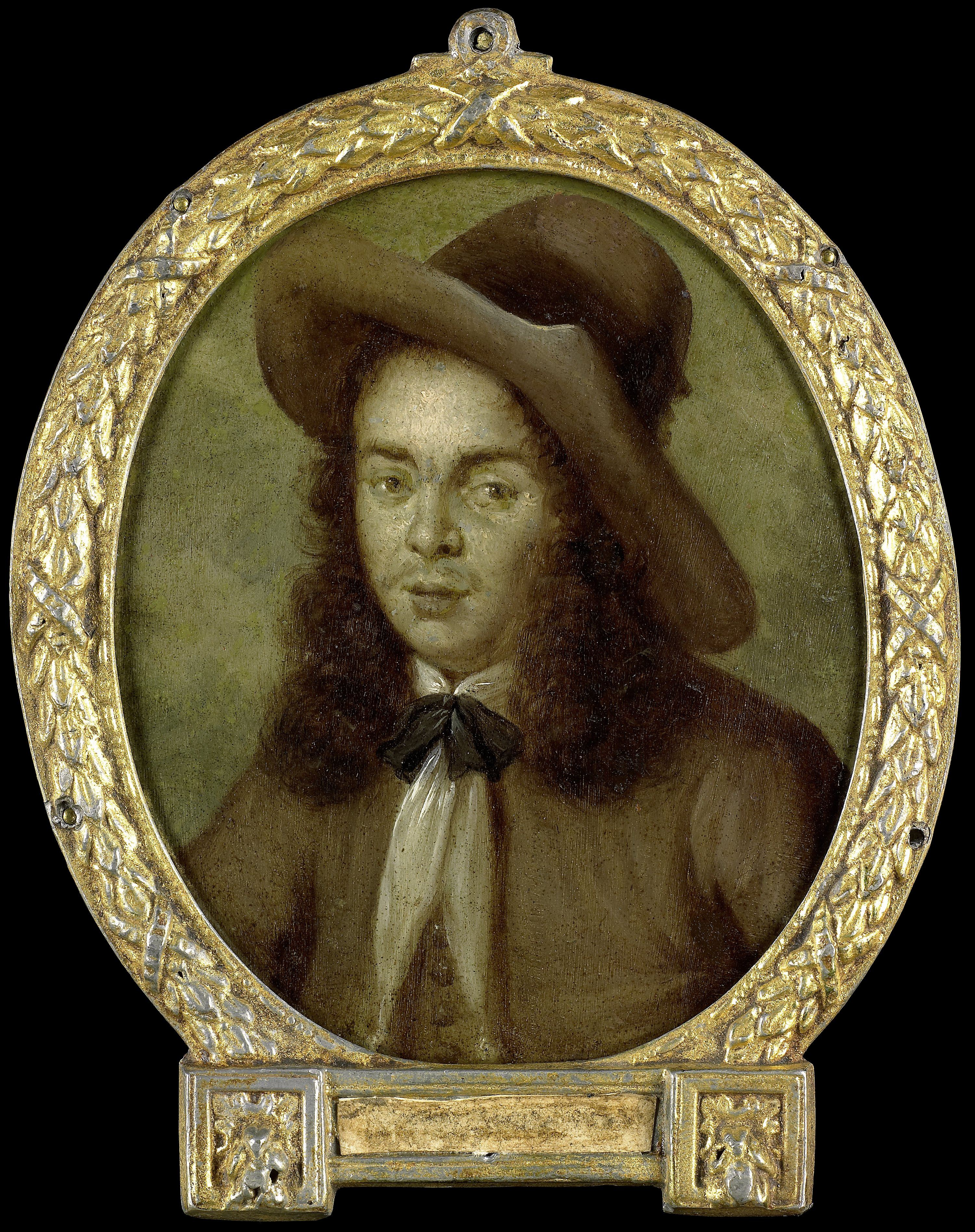
Van Overbeke by Jan Maurits Quinkhard.

Aernout van Overbeke (15 December 1632 – 19 July 1674) was a Dutch writer and humorist. His works include burlesque letters detailing his travels and a collection of jokes. His Rym-wercken was very popular and was reprinted nine times after his death.

== Life ==
He was born in Leiden, where his Antwerp-born parents had settled after marrying in Frankfurt and spending a period in Amsterdam. His family was quite wealthy, with a townhouse on the Rapenburg and a country residence in Alphen aan den Rijn and receiving illustrious guests such as Vossius and Barlaeus. However, Aernout's father later got into financial difficulties, which seem to have affected his health - he died in 1638.

Van Overbeke entered Leiden University aged eleven and completed his legal studies there on 10 March 1655 with a disputation or thesis entitled De transactionibus. On 23 January 1659 he became a lawyer for the Court of Holland. He incurred many debts around this time, for example by writing a translation of the psalms into poetry for the Lutheran church at his own expense and then distributing it for free. It was probably his financial problems that led him to apply to work for the Dutch East India Company, becoming a fiscal lawyer for it and later becoming president of the Council of Justice for Batavia.

Van Overbeke returned to the Netherlands in 1672 and little is known of his life and work after that date. He died in Amsterdam on 19 July 1674 and was buried in his family vault at Leiden a week later.

== Works ==
- De psalmen Davids in Nederduytsche rymen gestelt. Amsterdam : Borrit Jansz. Smit, 1663.
- Geestige en Vermaeckelicke Reys-beschryvinge Van den Heer Aernout van Overbeke Naer Oost-Indiën gevaren, ten dienste van de E.E. Heeren Bewinthebberen van de Oost-Indische Compagnie, Voor Raet van Justitie, in den Jare 1668. Vervattende verscheyde kluchtige voorvallen, en koddige gedachten op de selve, geduerende sijn Reyse van Amsterdam tot Batavia. Amsterdam: Jan Joosten, 1671.
- De rym-wercken. Amsterdam, Jan Claesz. ten Hoorn, 1678.
- Anecdota sive historiae jocosae.
