= 1750 in science =

The year 1750 in science and technology involved some significant events.

== Astronomy ==
- Thomas Wright suggests that the Milky Way Galaxy is a disk-shaped system of stars with the Solar System near the centre.

== Exploration ==
- April 1 – Pehr Osbeck sets out on a primarily botanical expedition to China.

== Mathematics ==
- English mathematician Thomas Simpson formulates the Weber problem, and solves it geometrically in the triangle case.

== Physics ==
- January 17 – John Canton reads a paper before the Royal Society on a method of making artificial magnets.
- Approx. date – Leonhard Euler and Daniel Bernoulli develop the Euler–Bernoulli beam equation.

== Technology ==
- November 18 – Westminster Bridge across the River Thames in London, designed by the Swiss-born engineer Charles Labelye, is officially opened.

== Publications ==
- Historia Plantarum, originally written by Conrad Gessner between 1555 and 1565.

== Awards ==
- Copley Medal: George Edwards

== Births ==
- March 16 – Caroline Herschel, German-born English astronomer (died 1848)
- July 2 – François Huber, Swiss naturalist (died 1831)
- July 5 – Ami Argand, Genevan physicist and chemist (died 1803)
- September 22 – Christian Konrad Sprengel, German botanist (died 1816)
- October 25 – Marie Le Masson Le Golft, French naturalist (died 1826)
- Aaron Arrowsmith, English cartographer (died 1823)
- Jean Nicolas Fortin, French physicist and instrument maker who invented a portable mercury barometer in 1800 (died 1831)

== Deaths ==
- December 1 – Johann Gabriel Doppelmayr, German mathematician, astronomer, and cartographer (born 1677)
