= 1736 in science =

The year 1736 in science and technology involved some significant events.

== Botany ==
- Charles Marie de La Condamine, with François Fresneau Gataudière, makes the first scientific observations of rubber, in Ecuador.

== Earth sciences ==
- June 19 – French Academy of Sciences expedition led by Pierre Louis Maupertuis, with Anders Celsius, begins work on measuring a meridian arc in the Torne Valley of Finland.

== Mathematics ==
- June 8 – Leonhard Euler writes to James Stirling describing the Euler–Maclaurin formula, providing a connection between integrals and calculus.
- Euler produces the first published proof of Fermat's "little theorem".
- Sir Isaac Newton's Method of Fluxions (1671), describing his method of differential calculus, is first published (posthumously) and Thomas Bayes publishes a defense of its logical foundations against the criticism of George Berkeley (anonymously).

== Medicine ==
- Early 1736 – The “Publick Workhouse and House of Correction” that is to become Bellevue Hospital in New York City is ready for occupancy.
- c. October – Winchester County Hospital, established by Prebendary Alured Clarke, the first voluntary general hospital in the English provinces.

== Awards ==
- Copley Medal: John Theophilus Desaguliers

== Births ==
- January 19 – James Watt, Scottish mechanical engineer (died 1819)
- January 25 – Joseph Louis Lagrange, Piedmont-born mathematician (died 1813)
- June 14 – Charles-Augustin de Coulomb, French physicist (died 1806)
- July 12 – Louis Lépecq de La Clôture, French epidemiologist (died 1804)
- August 19 – Erland Samuel Bring, Swedish mathematician (died 1798)
- November 3 – Christiaan Brunings, Dutch hydraulic engineer (died 1805)
- John Arnold, Cornish-born watchmaker (died 1799)
- Honoré Blanc, French gunsmith (died 1801)

== Deaths ==
- September 16 – Gabriel Fahrenheit, German-born Dutch physicist and engineer (born 1686)
- October 13 – Georges Mareschal, French surgeon (born 1658)
