= 1738 in science =

The year 1738 in science and technology involved some significant events.

== Astronomy ==
- Pierre Louis Maupertuis publishes Sur la figure de la terre, which confirms Newton's view that the Earth is an oblate spheroid slightly flattened at the poles.

== Botany ==
- Publication of Hortus Cliffortianus, a detailed description by Linnaeus of George Clifford's gardens at Hartekamp, Netherlands, including the raising of exotic plants such as bananas in a greenhouse.
- Publication of Rariorum Africanarum plantarum, a flora of Cape Colony by Johannes Burman, begins publication in Amsterdam.

== Fluid dynamics ==
- Daniel Bernoulli publishes Hydrodynamica, which eventually christened the field of fluid mechanics and fluid dynamics (hydrodynamics).

== Mathematics ==
- Abraham de Moivre publishes the second English edition of his The Doctrine of Chances containing a study of the coefficients in the binomial expansion of (a + b)^{n}.

== Medicine ==
- February – Great Plague of 1738, an outbreak of bubonic plague, begins to spread from Banat across central Europe.
- Establishment of The Mineral Water Hospital in Bath, England.

== Metallurgy ==
- July 1 – William Champion of Bristol patents a process to distill zinc from calamine using charcoal in a smelter.

== Technology ==
- June 24 – Lewis Paul and John Wyatt obtain an English patent for roller cotton-spinning machinery, leading to the establishment of mechanised Paul-Wyatt cotton mills.
- Jacques de Vaucanson presents the world's first automaton, The Flute Player (1737) to the French Academy of Sciences.
- Black Forest clockmaker Franz Ketterer produces one of the earliest cuckoo clocks.

== Awards ==
- Copley Medal: James Valoue

== Births ==
- November 15 – William Herschel, German-born astronomer (died 1822)

== Deaths ==
- June 21 – Charles Townshend, 2nd Viscount Townshend, English agriculturalist (born 1674)
- September 23 – Herman Boerhaave, Dutch physician (born 1668)
