= Actio Curiosa =

1678 Hungarian play

Actio Curiosa is a Hungarian play by an unknown author. It was first produced in 1678. The title is Latin, meaning "Strange Play".
