= John Mayow =

English scientist (1641–1679)

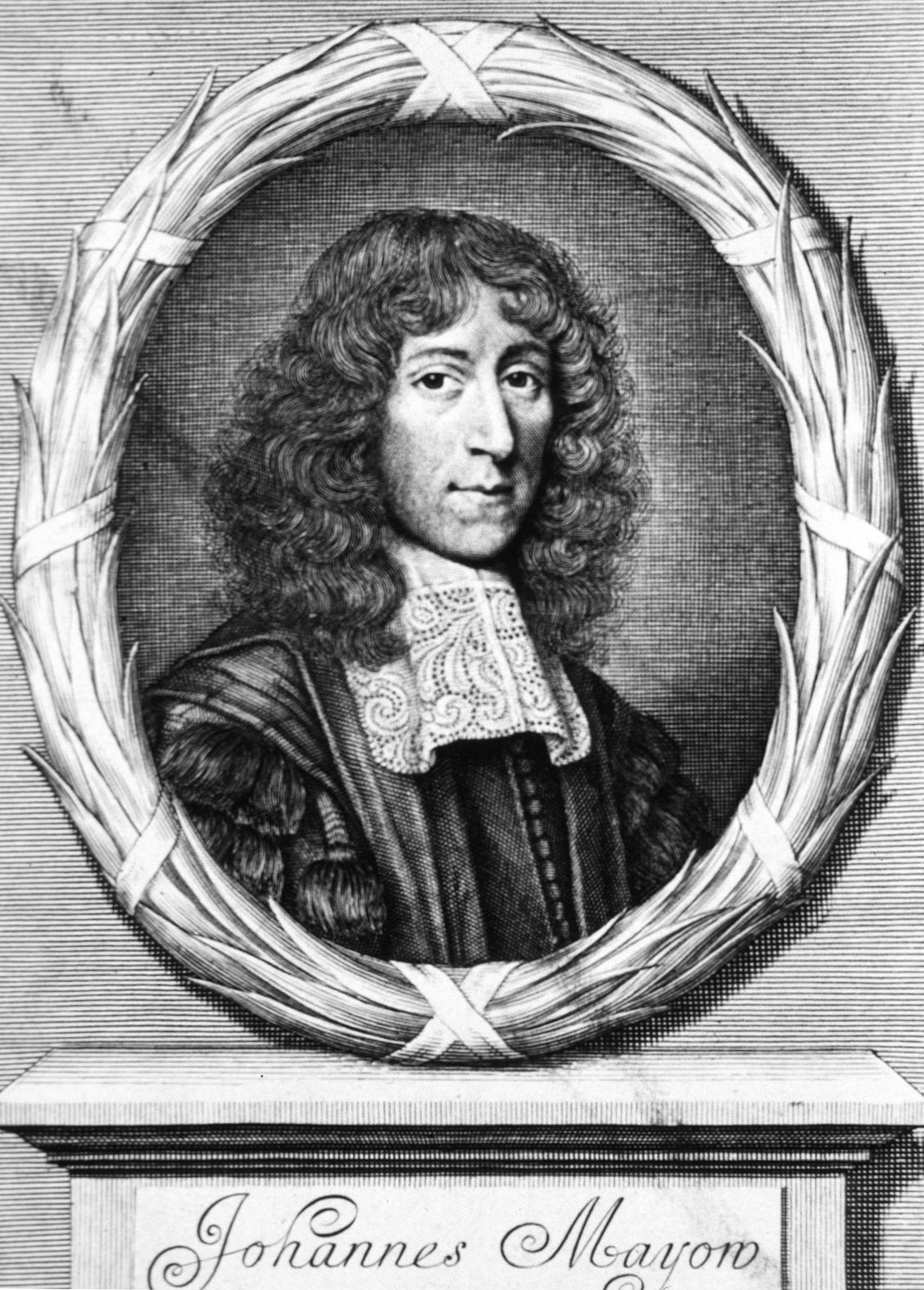
- John Mayow
- Born: 1641
- Died: 1679; London, England
- Known for: pneumatic chemistry
- Scientific career
- Fields: chemistry

John Mayow FRS (1641–1679) was a chemist, physician, and physiologist who is remembered today for conducting early research into respiration and the nature of air. Mayow worked in a field that is sometimes called pneumatic chemistry.

== Life ==
There has been controversy over both the location and year of Mayow's birth, with both Cornwall and London claimed, along with birth years from 1641 to 1645. Proctor's extensive research led him to conclude that Mayow was born in 1641 near Morval in Cornwall and that he was admitted to Wadham College, Oxford at age 17 in 1658. A year later Mayow became a scholar at Oxford, and in 1660 he was elected to a fellowship at All Souls. He graduated in law (bachelor, 1665, doctor, 1670), but made medicine his profession, and became noted for his practice therein, especially in the summer time, in the city of Bath. In 1678, on the proposal of Robert Hooke, Mayow was appointed a fellow of the Royal Society. The following year, after a marriage which was not altogether to Mayow's content, he died in London and was buried in the Church of St Paul, Covent Garden.

== Scientific work ==
Mayow also discovered that there were two constituents of air. Inactive and active. Mayow published at Oxford in 1668 two tracts, on respiration and rickets, and in 1674 these were reprinted, the former in an enlarged and corrected form, with three others De sal-nitro et spiritu nitro-aereo, De respiratione foetus in utero et ovo, and De motu musculari et spiritibus animalibus as Tractatus quinque medico-physici. The contents of this work, which was several times republished and translated into Dutch, German and French, show him to have been an investigator much in advance of his time.

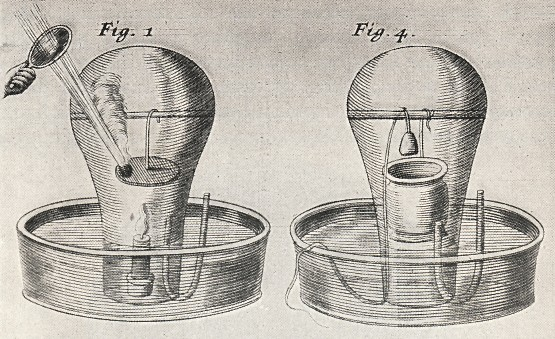
Equipment used by Mayow in experiments on burning

Accepting as proved by Boyle's experiments that air is necessary for combustion, Mayow showed that fire is supported not by the air as a whole but by a more active and subtle part of it. This part he called "spiritus igneo-aereus," or sometimes "nitro-aereus", for he identified it with one of the constituents of the acid portion of nitre (now called potassium nitrate, KNO_{3}) which he regarded as formed by the union of fixed alkali with a spiritus acidus. In combustion the particulae nitro-aereae – either pre-existent in the thing consumed or supplied by the air – combined with the material burnt; as Mayow inferred from his observation that antimony, strongly heated with a burning glass, undergoes an increase of weight which can be attributed to nothing else but these particles.

Mayow argued that the same particles are consumed in respiration, because he found that when a small animal and a lighted candle were placed in a closed vessel full of air the candle first went out and soon afterwards the animal died. However, if there was no candle present the animal lived twice as long. He concluded that this constituent of the air is absolutely necessary for life, and supposed that the lungs separate it from the atmosphere and pass it into the blood. It is also necessary, Mayow inferred, for all muscular movements, and he thought there was reason to believe that the sudden contraction of muscle is produced by its combination with other combustible (salino-sulphureous) particles in the body; hence the heart, being a muscle, ceases to beat when respiration is stopped. Animal heat also is due to the union of nitro-aerial particles, breathed in from the air, with the combustible particles in the blood, and is further formed by the combination of these two sets of particles in muscle during violent exertion.

In effect, therefore, Mayow – who also gives a remarkably correct anatomical description of the mechanism of respiration – preceded Priestley and Lavoisier by a century in recognising the existence of oxygen, under the guise of his "spiritus nitro-aereus," as a separate entity distinct from the general mass of the air. Mayow perceived the part "spiritus nitro-aereus" plays in combustion and in increasing the weight of the calces (oxides) of metals as compared with metals themselves. Rejecting the common notions of his time that the use of breathing is to cool the heart, or assist the passage of the blood from the right to the left side of the heart, or merely to agitate it, Mayow saw in inspiration a mechanism for introducing oxygen into the body, where it is consumed for the production of heat and muscular activity. He even vaguely conceived of expiration as an excretory process. Using bell-jars over water Mayow showed that the active substance that we today call oxygen constitutes about a fifth part of the air.

Parts of Mayow's work seem to agree with modern ideas regarding air and combustion. Mayow noted, as had others before him, that some materials gain weight on strong heating. Antoine Lavoisier (1743–1794) and others later interpreted this gain in terms of a reaction with a gaseous material (oxygen) in the air. See Holmyard and others for critiques of Mayow's work and comparisons to modern chemical thought.

== Honours ==
- Fellow of the Royal Society (1678)
