= 1687 in literature =

This article contains information about the literary events and publications of 1687.

== Events ==
- A Latin edition of the works of Confucius is published in Paris, the first translation of his works into any Western language. Confucian Sinarum Philosophus is the work of Jesuit scholars and Chinese converts to Christianity.
- The Académie française publishes the first sections of its Dictionnaire in Frankfurt.

== New books ==
=== Prose ===
- Antoine Furetière – Couches de l'Académie
- Ihara Saikaku
  - The Great Mirror of Male Love (男色大鑑, Nanshoku Ōkagami)
  - Transmission of the Martial Arts (武道伝来記, Budō Denraiki)
- Gerard Langbaine – Momus Triumphans, or the Plagiaries of the English Stage Exposed
- Isaac Newton – Philosophiae Naturalis Principia Mathematica (Mathematical Principles of Natural Philosophy)
- Charles Perrault – Le Siècle de Louis le Grand (The Century of Louis the Great)
- George Savile, 1st Marquess of Halifax – Letter to a Dissenter

=== Drama ===
- Aphra Behn – The Emperor of the Moon
- Florent Carton Dancourt
  - Le Chevalier à la mode
  - La Désolation des joueuses
- Sir Charles Sedley – Bellamira, or The Mistress
- Nahum Tate:
  - The History of King Lear (adapted from Shakespeare's Lear, but with a happy ending)
  - The Island Princess (adapted from Fletcher's Island Princess)

=== Poetry ===
- John Dryden – The Hind and the Panther
- Matthew Prior – The Hind and the Panther Transversed to the Story of the Country and the City Mouse

== Births ==
- March 7 – Jean Lebeuf, French historian (died 1760)
- June 24 – Johann Albrecht Bengel, German classicist and theologian (died 1752)
- c. August 26 – Henry Carey, English poet, dramatist and songwriter (suicide 1743)
- November 7 – William Stukeley, English antiquary (died 1765)

== Deaths ==
- February 16 – Charles Cotton, English poet and translator (born 1630)
- March 27 – Edward Sheldon, English translator of religious works (born 1599)
- March 28 – Constantijn Huygens, Dutch poet and composer (born 1596)
- September 1 – Henry More, English philosopher (born 1614)
- November 3 - René Rapin, French Jesuit writer (born 1621)
- November 7 – Isaac Orobio de Castro, Portuguese Jewish philosopher and apologist (born c. 1617)
- December 16 – William Petty, English economist and philosopher (born 1623)
- Unknown date – George Dalgarno, Scottish linguist (born 1626)
