= 1669 in literature =

This article contains information about the literary events and publications of 1669.

== Events ==
- May 31 – Samuel Pepys makes the last entry in his diary.
- unknown dates
  - Frances Boothby's tragicomedy Marcelia, or, The Treacherous Friend is performed by the King's Company at the Theatre Royal, Drury Lane, the first play by a woman to be produced in London.
  - The final section of Parthenissa, the prose romance by Roger Boyle, 1st Earl of Orrery, is published. Earlier portions of the work have appeared in 1651 and 1654–1656.

== New books ==
=== Prose ===
- Anonymous (Gabriel-Joseph de la Vergne?) – Letters of a Portuguese Nun (Les Lettres portugaises)
- Hans Jakob Christoffel von Grimmelshausen – Simplicius Simplicissimus (first major novel in the German language, dated this year but probably published in 1668)
- Blaise Pascal – Pensees (published posthumously)
- William Penn – No Cross, No Crown
- Jan Swammerdam – Dutch: Algemeene Verhandeling van de bloedeloose dierkens
- John Wagstaffe – The Question of Witchcraft Debated

=== Drama ===
- Anonymous – The Imperial Tragedy
- John Dryden – Tyrannic Love
- Roger Boyle, 1st Earl of Orrery
  - Guzman
  - Mr. Anthony
- Robert Howard and George Villiers, Duke of Buckingham – The Country Gentleman (written, not staged)
- John Lacy – The Dumb Lady
- Jean Racine – Britannicus

== Births ==
- December 16 – Joseph-Anne-Marie de Moyriac de Mailla, French missionary and translator in China (died 1748)
- unknown dates
  - Nicholas Blundell, English diarist (died 1737)
  - Lady Lucy Herbert, English devotional writer (died 1744)
  - Jiang Tingxi (蒋廷锡), Chinese encyclopedist (died 1732)
- probable – Susanna Centlivre, English poet and actress (died 1723)

== Deaths ==
- February 3 – Catharina Questiers, Dutch poet and dramatist (born 1631)
- March 19 – John Denham, Irish poet (born 1615)
- July 10 or 11 – Robert Stapylton, English dramatist and courtier (born c. 1607–1609)
- September 30 – Henry King, English poet and bishop (born 1592)
- October 8 – Jane Cavendish, English poet and playwright (born 1621)
- December 16 – Nathaniel Fiennes, English pamphleteer, soldier and politician (born c. 1608)
- December 24 – Henry Foulis, English theologian and controversialist (born 1638)
