= 1689 in science =

The year 1689 in science and technology involved some significant events.

== Astronomy ==
- Publication of the first astronomical book in Japan, Tenmon Zukai (天文圖解) by Tsunenori (or Jōhan) Iguchi at Osaka.

== Botany ==
- Pierre Magnol publishes Prodromus historiae generalis plantarum, in quo familiae plantarum per tabulas disponuntur ("Precursor to a general history of plants, in which the families of plants are arranged in tables") in Montpellier, the first example of a natural classification of plant families based on morphological characteristics.

== Earth sciences ==
- Johann Weikhard von Valvasor, a pioneer of the study of karst in Slovenia (and Fellow of the Royal Society of London) introduces the word karst to European scholars, describing the phenomenon of underground flows of rivers in his account of Lake Cerknica.

== Medicine ==
- Walter Harris publishes De Morbis Acutis Infantum in London; it remains a standard textbook on pediatrics for nearly a century.
- Richard Morton published Phthisiologia, seu exercitationes de Phthisi tribus libris comprehensae, emphasizing the tubercle as the origin of tuberculosis.

== Technology ==
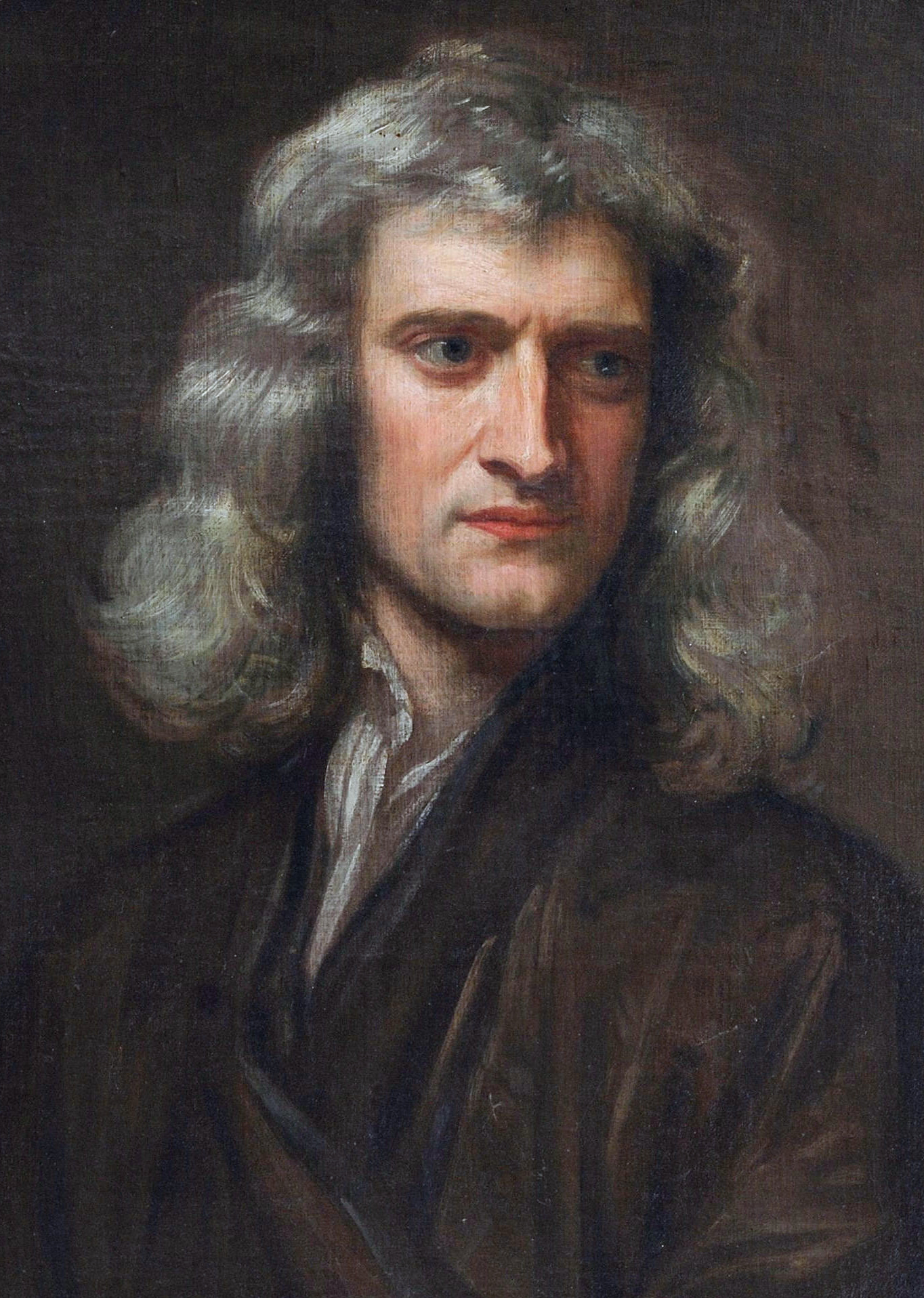
Kneller's portrait of Newton

- A centrifugal pump is invented by Denis Papin.
- Physician and collector Hans Sloane develops a milk chocolate drink in Jamaica.
- The first US newspaper, Publick Occurrences Both Forreign and Domestick, is printed in Massachusetts.
- The earliest known English breech-loading rifle is built by Willmore, who was apprenticed to Foad.

== Events ==
- Isaac Newton becomes a Member of Parliament.
- Godfrey Kneller paints a portrait of Isaac Newton at age 46.

== Births ==
- October 16 (approx.) – Robert Smith, English mathematician (died 1768)

== Deaths ==
- December 29 – Thomas Sydenham, English physician (born 1624)
