= 1688 in science =

The year 1688 in science and technology included a number of events, some of which are listed here.

== Astronomy ==
- The constellation Sceptrum Brandenburgicum is named by Gottfried Kirch.

== Exploration ==
- A French Jesuit scientific mission led by Jean de Fontaney arrives in China.

== Mathematics ==
- Simon de la Loubère introduces the Siamese method for constructing any size of n-odd magic square to Western Europe.

== Technology ==
- Earliest known mention of the balalaika.

== Births ==
- January 29 – Emanuel Swedenborg, Swedish scientist and theologian (died 1772)
- April 4 – Joseph-Nicolas Delisle, French astronomer (died 1768)
- August 14 – Johann Leonhard Rost, German astronomer (died 1727)
- September 26 – Willem 's Gravesande, Dutch polymath (died 1742)
- November 15 – Louis Bertrand Castel, French Jesuit mathematician and physicist (died 1757)

== Deaths ==
- January 28 – Ferdinand Verbiest, Flemish Jesuit astronomer in China (born 1623)
- October 9 – Claude Perrault, French architect and physicist (born 1613)
- November 11 – Jean-Baptiste de La Quintinie, French horticulturalist (born 1626)
