= 1686 in science =

The year 1686 in science and technology involved some significant events.

== Astronomy ==
- Gottfried Kirch notices that Chi Cygni's brightness varies.

== Biology ==
- John Ray begins publication of his Historia Plantarum, including the first biological definition of the term species; also his edition of Francis Willughby's Historia Piscum.

== Geology ==
- Edmund Halley establishes the relationship between barometric pressure and height above sea level.

== Meteorology ==
- Edmund Halley presents a systematic study of the trade winds and monsoons and identifies solar heating as the cause of atmospheric motions.

== Physics ==
- Isaac Newton uses a fixed length pendulum with weights of varying composition to test the weak equivalence principle to 1 part in 1000.

== Births ==
- February 10 – Jan Frederik Gronovius, Dutch botanist (died 1762)
- May 24 – Gabriel Fahrenheit, physicist and inventor (died 1736)
- July 6 – Antoine de Jussieu, French naturalist (died 1758)
- October (possible date) – John Machin, English mathematician (died 1751)

== Deaths ==
- May 11 – Otto von Guericke, German physicist (born 1602)
- November 25 (NS December 5) – Nicolas Steno, Danish pioneer geologist and bishop (born 1638)
