= 1687 in science =

The year 1687 in science and technology involved some significant events.

== Astronomy ==
- The constellation Triangulum Minus is named by Johannes Hevelius and published posthumously in Prodromus Astronomiae in 1690.

== Biology ==
- Still life painter Alida Withoos, while commissioned by botanist and art collector Agnes Block at her estate, Vijverhof, makes a painting of the first pineapple bred in Europe. This work did not survive and is considered lost.

== Medicine ==
- Dutch physician Willem ten Rhijne publishes Verhandelinge van de Asiatise Melaatsheid na een naaukeuriger ondersoek ten dienste van het gemeen in Amsterdam, explaining Asian leprosy to the West.

== Physics ==
- July 5 – Isaac Newton's Philosophiæ Naturalis Principia Mathematica, known as the Principia, is published by the Royal Society of London. In it, Newton describes his theory of universal gravitation, explains the laws of mechanics (including Newton's laws of motion), gives a formula for the speed of sound and demonstrates that Earth is an oblate spheroid. The concepts in the Principia become the foundations of modern physics.

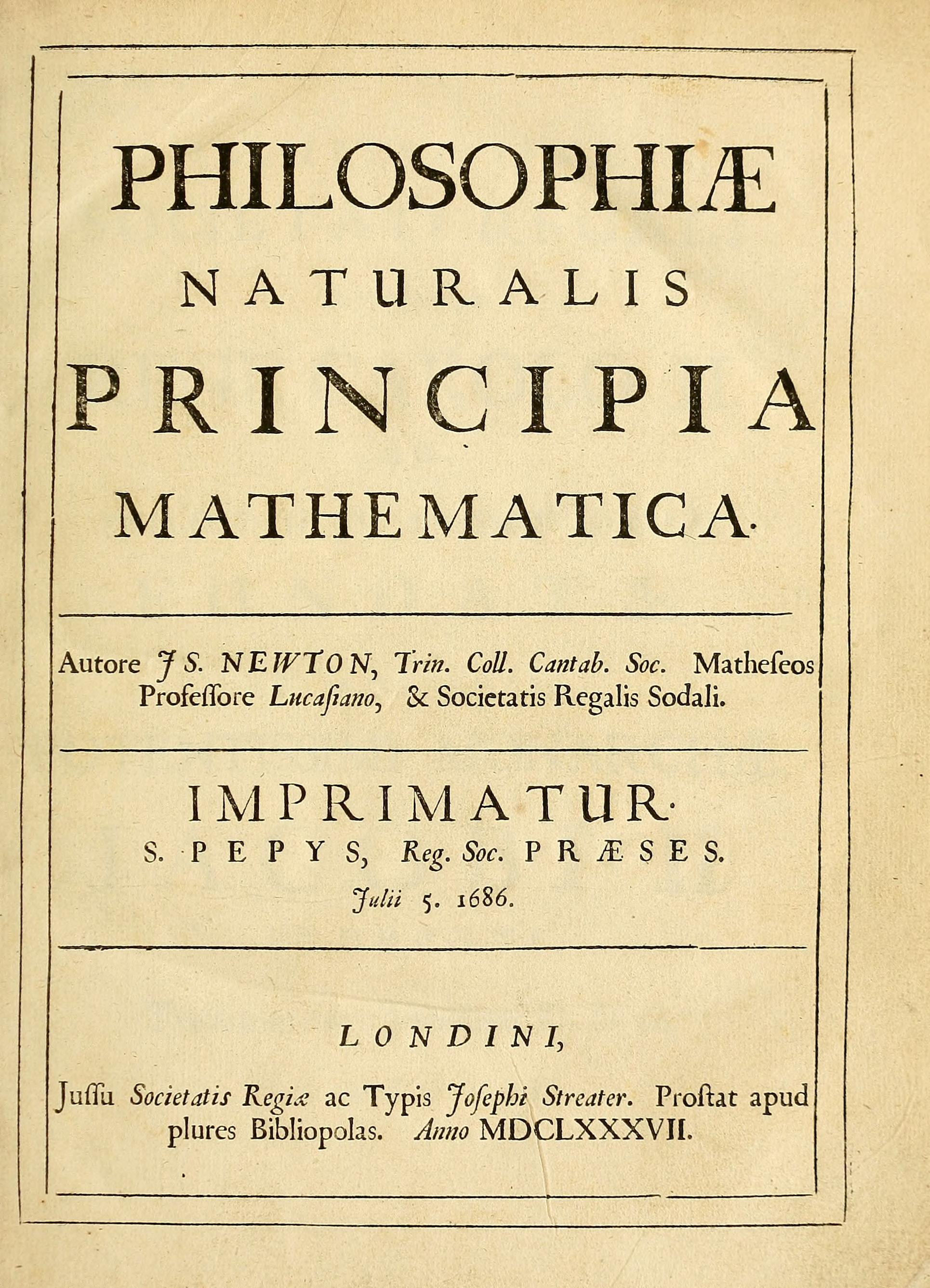

== Births ==
- October 14 – Robert Simson, Scottish mathematician (died 1768).

== Deaths ==
- January 28 – Johannes Hevelius, German astronomer (born 1611).
