= 1685 in science =

The year 1685 in science and technology involved some significant events.

== Mathematics ==
- Adam Adamandy Kochański publishes an approximation for squaring the circle.

== Physiology and medicine ==
- Charles Allen publishes the first book in English on dentistry, The Operator for the Teeth.
- Govert Bidloo publishes an atlas of human anatomy, Ontleding des menschelyken lichaams, with plates by Gerard de Lairesse.

== Technology ==
- Menno van Coehoorn publishes his principal treatise on fortification, Nieuwe Vestingbouw op een natte of lage horisont, in Leeuwarden.

== Births ==
- August 18 – Brook Taylor, English mathematician (died 1731)
- November 17 – Pierre Gaultier de Varennes et de la Vérendrye, French Canadian explorer (died 1749)

== Deaths ==
- February 2 – Pierre Bourdelot, French physician, anatomist, freethinker, abbé and libertine (born 1610)
- November 23 – Bernard de Gomme, military engineer in England (born 1620)
- December 12 – John Pell, English mathematician (born 1611)
