= 1658 in science =

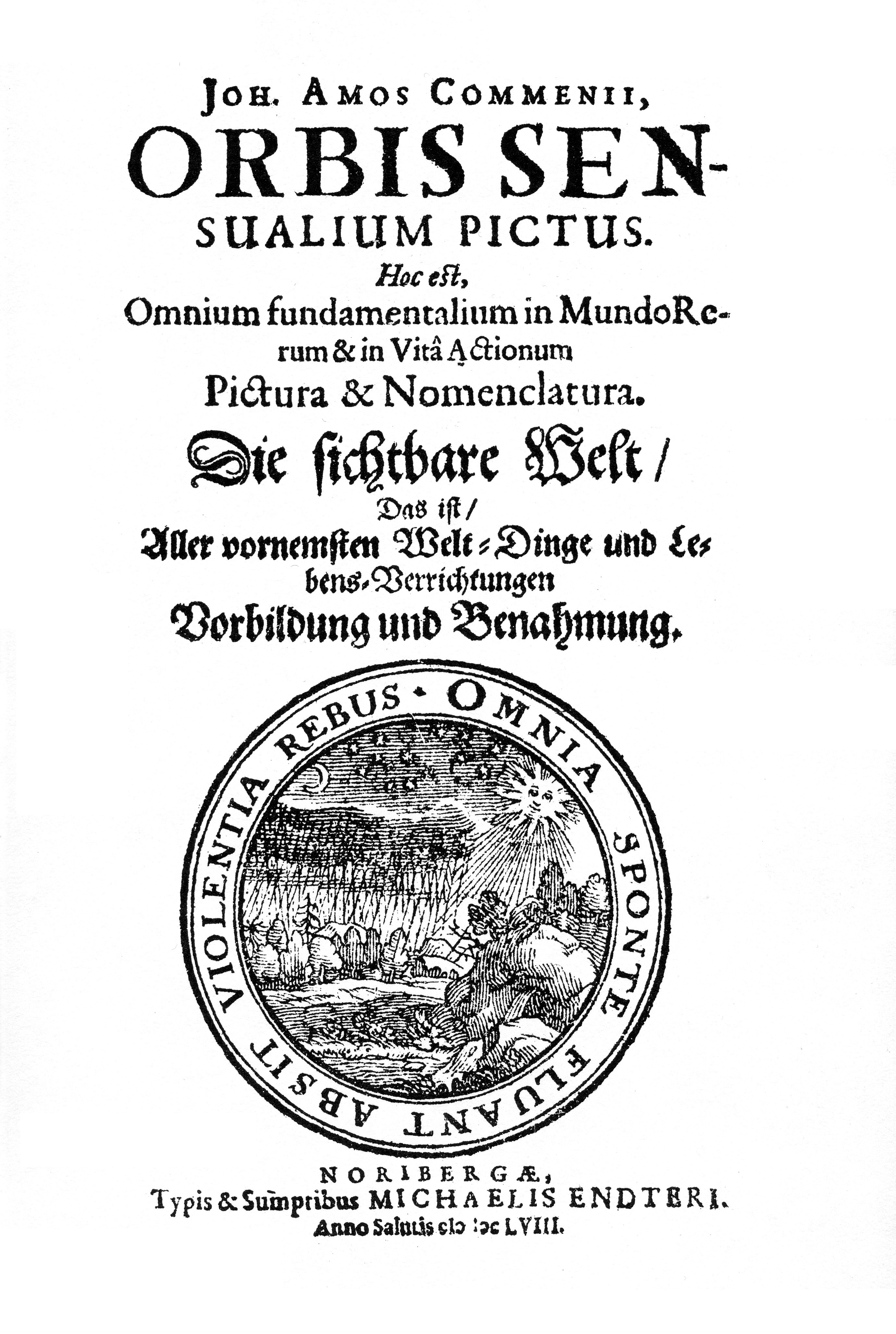
Title page of Comenius: Orbis sensualium pictus (1658 edition).

The year 1658 in science and technology involved some significant events.

== Astronomy ==
- approx. date – Kamalakara compiles his major work, Siddhāntatattvaviveka, in Varanasi.

== Life sciences ==
- Jan Swammerdam observes red blood cells (in the frog) with the aid of a microscope.
- Samuel Volckertzoon observes a quokka on Rottnest Island.

== Mathematics ==
- Christopher Wren gives the first published proof of the arc length of a cycloid.

== Publication ==
- Posthumous publication of Arzneibüchlein, pharmacopoeia compiled by Anna von Diesbach.

== Births ==
- March 5 – Antoine Laumet de La Mothe, sieur de Cadillac, French explorer (died 1730)
- April 2 - Pierre Pomet, French pharmacist (died 1699)
- April 8 - Georges Mareschal, French surgeon (died 1736)
- unknown date – Nicolas Andry, French physician (died 1742)

== Deaths ==
- January 9 - Pierre-Jean Fabre, French physician and alchemist (born 1588)
- October 22 – Charles Bouvard, French herbalist (born 1572)
