= 1666 in science =

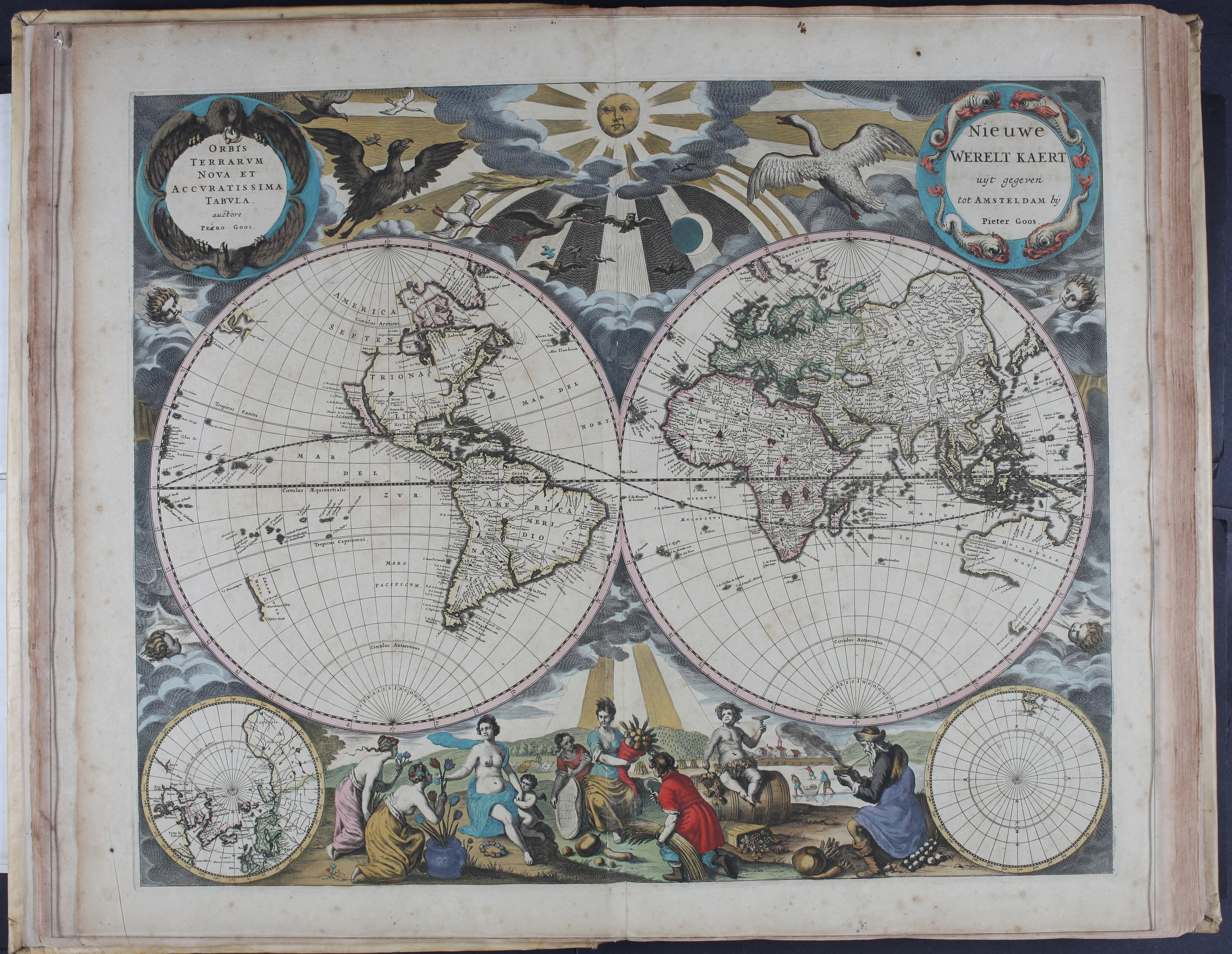
Orbis Terrarum Nova et Accuratissima Tabula (A New and Most Accurate Map of the World), 1666

The year 1666 in science and technology involved some significant events.

== Events ==
- December 22 – French Academy of Sciences first meets.

== Astronomy ==
- Publication of Stanisław Lubieniecki's Theatrum Cometicum begins in Amsterdam, the first encyclopedia and atlas of comets.

== Botany ==
- Establishment of Herrenhäuser Gärten, Hanover.

== Mathematics ==
- Isaac Newton develops differential calculus.
- Samuel Morland produces several designs of pocket calculating machine and also publishes A New Method of Cryptography.

== Physics ==
- Isaac Newton uses a prism to split sunlight into the component colours of the optical spectrum, assisting understanding of the nature of light.
- Robert Hooke and Giovanni Alfonso Borelli both expound gravitation as an attractive force (Hooke's lecture "On gravity" at the Royal Society of London on March 21; Borelli's Theoricae Mediceorum planetarum ex causis physicis deductae, published in Florence later in the year).

== Publications ==
- Margaret Cavendish, Duchess of Newcastle upon Tyne, publishes Observations upon Experimental Philosophy, including an attack on Robert Hooke's Micrographia.

== Births ==
- December – Stephen Gray, English scientist (died 1736)

== Deaths ==
- Giovanni Battista Baliani, Genoese physicist (born 1582)
- Song Yingxing, Chinese encyclopedist (born 1587)
