= 1663 in science =

Some significant events in science and technology occurred in the year 1663.

== Astronomy ==
- Scottish mathematician James Gregory publishes Optica Promota, describing theoretically the Gregorian telescope.

== Exploration ==
- March 4 – The Prince Edward Islands in the sub-antarctic Indian Ocean are discovered by Barent Barentszoon Lam of the Dutch ship Maerseveen and named Dina (Prince Edward) and Maerseveen (Marion).

== Mathematics ==
- The first book about games of chance, Girolamo Cardano's Liber de ludo aleae ("On Casting the Die"), written in the 1560s, is published.

== Meteorology ==
- October 7 – Robert Hooke presents his "Method for making a history of the weather" to the Royal Society of London.

== Technology ==
- The earliest known surviving clock with an anchor escapement is made by William Clement in England.

== Publications ==
- Robert Boyle publishes Considerations touching the Usefulness of Experimental Natural Philosophy (first part).

== Births ==
- August 31 – Guillaume Amontons, French scientific instrument inventor and physicist (died 1705)

== Deaths ==
- December 28 – Francesco Maria Grimaldi, Italian physicist (born 1618)
