= 1662 in science =

The year 1662 in science and technology involved some significant events.

== Botany ==
- February 16 – John Evelyn presents the basic text of his Sylva, or A Discourse of Forest-Trees and the Propagation of Timber to the College for the Promoting of Physico-Mathematical Experimental Learning, probably the earliest treatise on forestry (it is published in book form in 1664).

== Chemistry ==
- First attempt to manufacture graphite drawing sticks from powdered graphite (mixed with sulphur and antimony), in Nuremberg, Germany.

== Physics ==
- Robert Boyle publishes Boyle's law, in the second edition of his New Experiments Physico-Mechanicall, Touching The Spring of the Air, and its Effects (Oxford).

== Statistics ==
- c. January – John Graunt, in one of the earliest uses of statistics, publishes information about births and deaths in London.

== Events ==
- July 15 – The Royal Society of London receives its royal charter. Robert Hooke becomes its Curator of Experiments this year.

== Births ==
- December 13 – Francesco Bianchini, Italian astronomer (died 1729)

== Deaths ==
- April 22 – John Tradescant the Younger, English botanist (born 1608)
- August 19 – Blaise Pascal, French mathematician and physicist (born 1623)
