= 1661 in science =

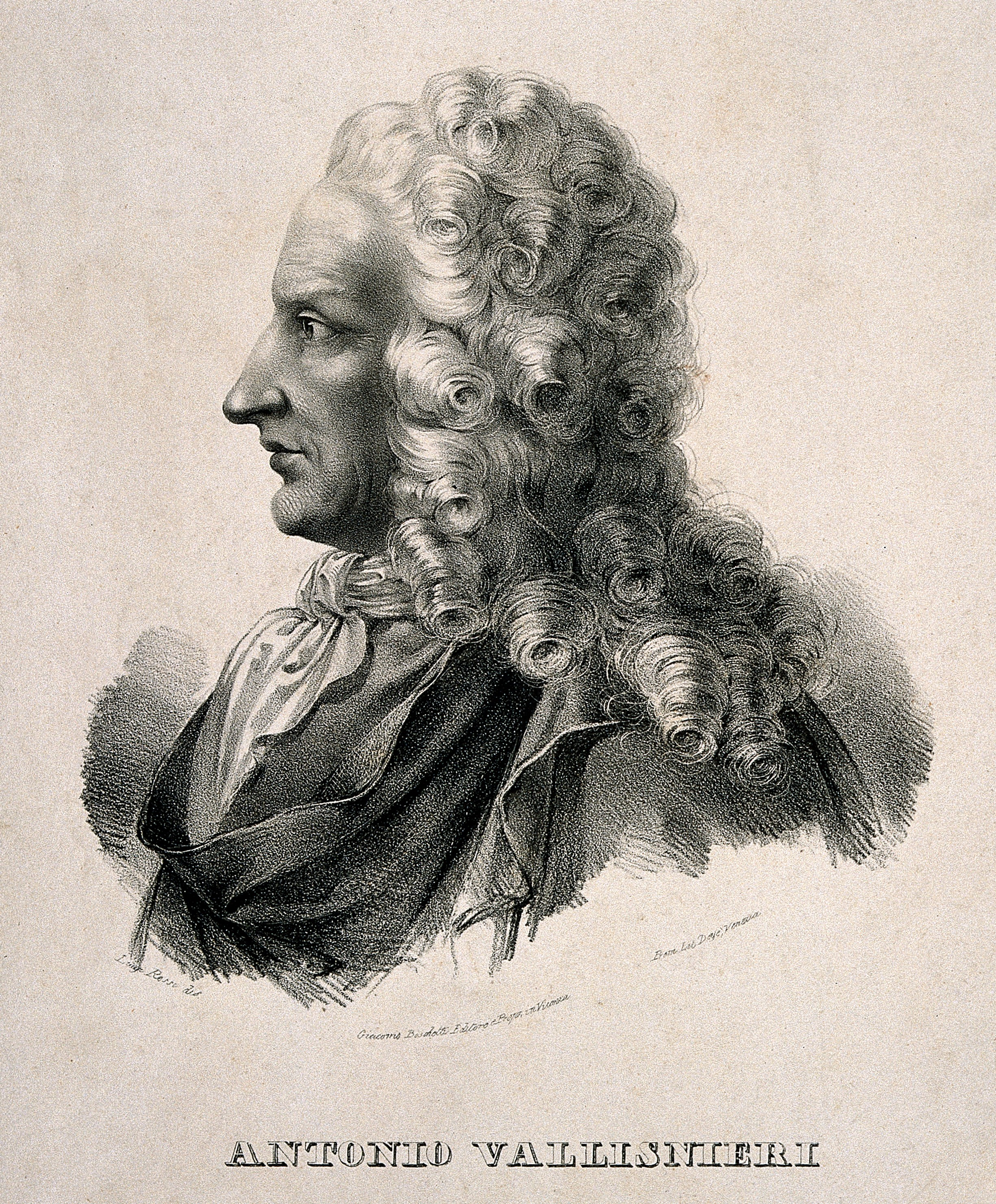
Vallisnieri, Antonio (1661-1730)

The year 1661 in science and technology involved some significant events.

== Biology ==
- Marcello Malpighi is the first to observe and correctly describe capillaries when he discovers them in a frog's lung.

== Chemistry ==
- Robert Boyle's The Sceptical Chymist is published in London.

== Environment ==
- c. May 1 – John Evelyn's pamphlet Fumifugium is one of the earliest descriptions of air pollution.

== Publications ==
- Abraham Cowley's pamphlet The Advancement of Experimental Philosophy.
- Johann Sperling's handbook Zoologia physica (posthumous).

== Births ==
- May 3 – Antonio Vallisneri, Italian physician and natural scientist (died 1730)
- June 7 – Guillaume François Antoine, Marquis de l'Hôpital, French mathematician (died 1704)
- December 18 – Christopher Polhem, Swedish scientist and inventor (died 1751)
- approx. date – Alida Withoos, Dutch botanical artist (died 1730)

== Events ==
- Isaac Newton is admitted to Trinity College, Cambridge, as a sizar (June)

== Deaths ==
- October – Gérard Desargues, French geometer (born 1591)
