= 1684 in science =

The year 1684 in science and technology involved some significant events.

== Astronomy ==
- December 10 – Edmond Halley presents the paper De motu corporum in gyrum, containing Isaac Newton's derivation of Kepler's laws of planetary motion (incorporating inverse-square force) from his theory of gravity, to the Royal Society in London.

== Mathematics ==
- Gottfried Leibniz publishes the first account of differential calculus.

== Publications ==
- Robert Boyle publishes Experiments and Considerations about the Porosity of Bodies, the first work on this topic.
- Raymond Vieussens publishes Neurographia universalis, a "pioneering work" on the nervous system.

== Births ==
- Celia Grillo Borromeo, Italian scientist and mathematician (died 1777)

== Deaths ==
- April 5 – William Brouncker, 2nd Viscount Brouncker, English mathematician (born 1620)
- May 11 – Daniel Whistler, English physician (born c. 1619)
- May 12 – Edme Mariotte, French physicist known for his recognition of Boyle's law (born 1620)
- October – Dud Dudley, English metallurgist (born 1600?)
