= 1668 in science =

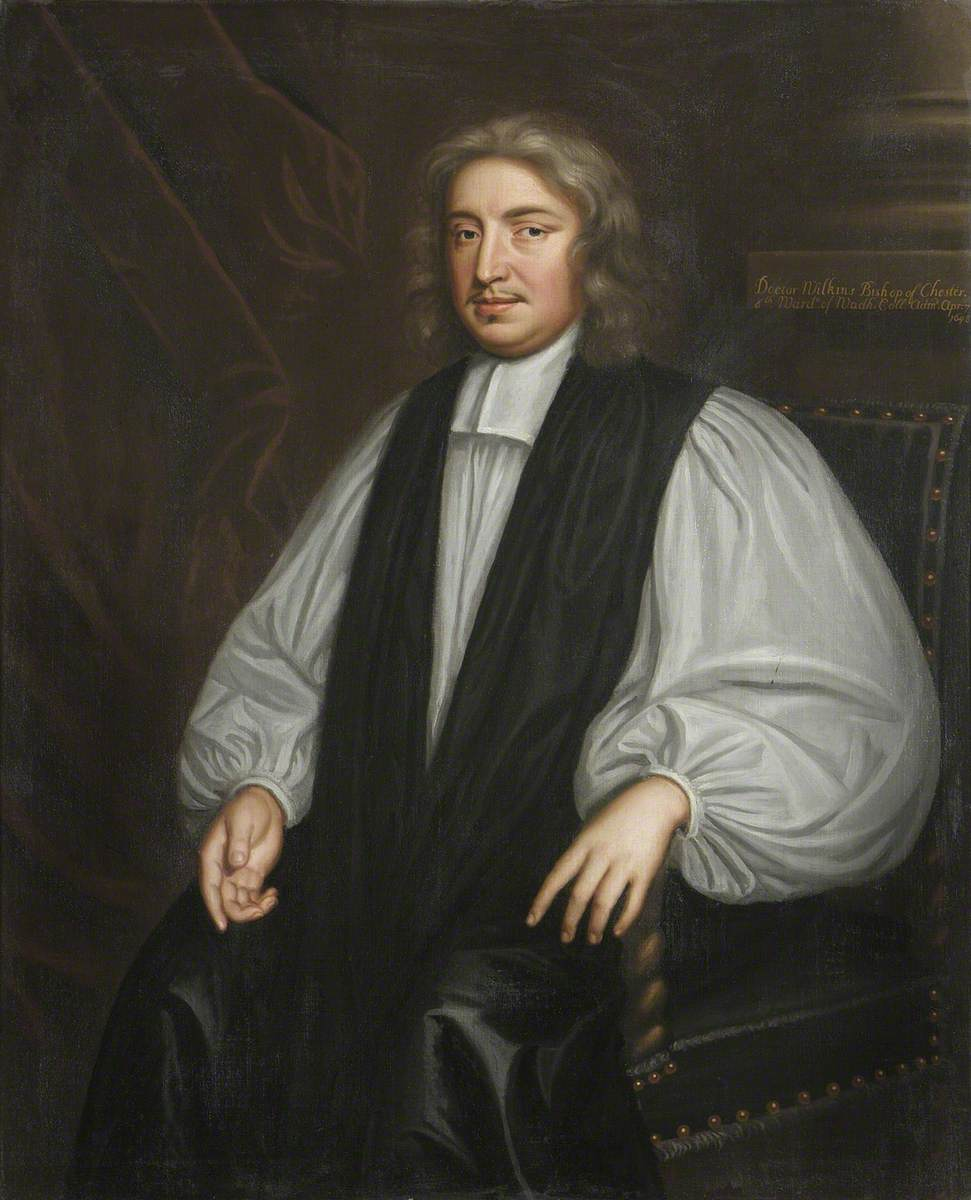
John Wilkins, author of An Essay towards a Real Character and a Philosophical Language

The year 1668 in science and technology involved some significant events.

== Astronomy ==
- Isaac Newton invents the reflecting telescope.

== Biology ==
- Francesco Redi publishes Esperienze Intorno alla Generazione degl'Insetti ("Experiments on the Generation of Insects"), disproving theories of the spontaneous generation of maggots in putrefying matter.

== Mathematics ==
- Nicholas Mercator and William Brouncker discover an infinite series for the logarithm while attempting to calculate the area under a hyperbolic segment.

== Medicine ==
- François Mauriceau publishes Traité des Maladies des Femmes Grosses et Accouchées in Paris, a key text in scientific obstetrics.
- John Mayow publishes a tract on respiration in Oxford, recognising "spiritus nitro-aereus" as a component of air, prefiguring the isolation of oxygen.

== Publications ==
- John Wilkins publishes An Essay towards a Real Character and a Philosophical Language proposing a universal language and a uniform system of measurement for international communication between natural philosophers.

== Births ==
- December 31 – Herman Boerhaave, Dutch physician and chemist who makes Leiden a European centre of medical knowledge (died 1738)
