= 1682 in science =

The year 1682 in science and technology involved some significant events.

== Astronomy ==
- A comet is observed, which later becomes known as Comet Halley, after Edmund Halley successfully predicts its return in 1758.

== Discoveries ==
- Antony Van Leeuwenhoek discovers the banded pattern of muscle fibers.

== Botany ==
- John Ray publishes his Methodus plantarum nova, which sets out his system to divide flowering plants into monocotyledons and dicotyledons.

== Exploration ==
- René Robert Cavelier, Sieur de La Salle canoes down the Mississippi River, naming the Mississippi basin Louisiana in honour of Louis XIV.

== Medicine ==
- English naval surgeon James Yonge (1646–1721) publishes Wounds of the Brain Proved Curable, probably the first monograph in English on surgery of the head.

== Births ==
- February 4 – Johann Friedrich Böttger, German alchemist and developer of porcelain manufacture (died 1719)
- February 25 – Giovanni Battista Morgagni, Italian anatomist (died 1771)
- March 24 – Mark Catesby, English naturalist (died 1749)
- April 16 – John Hadley, English mathematician (died 1744)
- July 10 – Roger Cotes, English mathematician (died 1716)

== Deaths ==
- July 12 – Jean Picard, French astronomer (born 1620)
- October – J. J. Becher, German physician and chemist (born 1635)
