= 1683 in science =

The year 1683 in science and technology involved some significant events.

== Geography ==
- Vincenzo Coronelli completes terrestrial and celestial globes for Louis XIV of France.

== Biology ==
- September 17 – Antonie van Leeuwenhoek writes a letter to the Royal Society of London describing "animalcules" – the first known description of protozoa.

== Mathematics ==
- May – Ehrenfried Walther von Tschirnhaus publishes the Tschirnhaus transformation.
- Based on his discovery of the resultant, Seki Takakazu starts to develop elimination theory in the Kai-fukudai-no-hō (解伏題之法,); and to express the resultant, he develops the notion of the determinant.
- Jacob Bernoulli discovers the mathematical constant e.

== Medicine ==
- Dutch physician Willem ten Rhijne publishes Dissertatio de Arthritide: Mantissa Schematica: De Acupunctura in London, introducing the West to acupuncture and moxibustion.

== Technology ==
- Vauban's manual on fortification, Le Directeur-Général des fortifications, begins publication at The Hague.

== Institutions ==
- May 24 – The Ashmolean Museum opens in Broad Street, Oxford (England) as the world's first purpose-built university museum, including accommodation for the teaching of natural philosophy and a chemistry laboratory. Naturalist Dr. Robert Plot is the first keeper and first professor of chemistry.
- October 15 – First meeting of the Dublin Philosophical Society, established by William Molyneux.

== Births ==
- February 28 – Rene Antoine Ferchault de Reaumur, French physicist (died 1757)
- December 23 – François Nicole, French mathematician (died 1758)
- Approximate date
  - Giovanni Poleni, Venetian mathematician and physicist (died 1761)
  - Edmund Weaver, English astronomer (died 1748)

== Deaths ==
- May 2 – Stjepan Gradić, Ragusan polymath (born 1613)
- November 10
  - John Collins, English mathematician (born 1625)
  - Robert Morison, Scottish botanist (born 1620)
