= 1670s in archaeology =

The decade of the 1670s in archaeology involved some significant events.

== Finds ==
- 1673: December 11 - Gray's Inn Lane Hand Axe excavated in London and recognised by John Conyers, the first paleolithic artefact to be identified as having human origins.
- 1674: July 17 - Two skeletons of children are discovered in the White Tower (Tower of London), believed at this time to be the remains of the Princes in the Tower.
- 1676
  - The first fossilised bone of what will be recognised as a dinosaur is discovered in England by Robert Plot, the femur of a Megalosaurus from a limestone quarry at Cornwell near Chipping Norton, Oxfordshire.
  - A Bronze Age lance head is excavated at Broughton Hall, North Yorkshire, England.

== Events ==
- 1675: March 25 - Loss of HMY Mary off Anglesey.

== Births ==
- 1671: January 15 - Abraham de la Pryme, English antiquary (d. 1704).
- 1673: November 21 - Nicholas Mahudel, French antiquary (d. 1747).
- 1675: June 1 - Francesco Scipione, marchese di Maffei, Italian archaeologist (d. 1755).

== Deaths ==
Preceded by 1660s in archaeology	Archaeology timeline 1670s	Succeeded by 1680s in archaeology
