= 1669 in science =

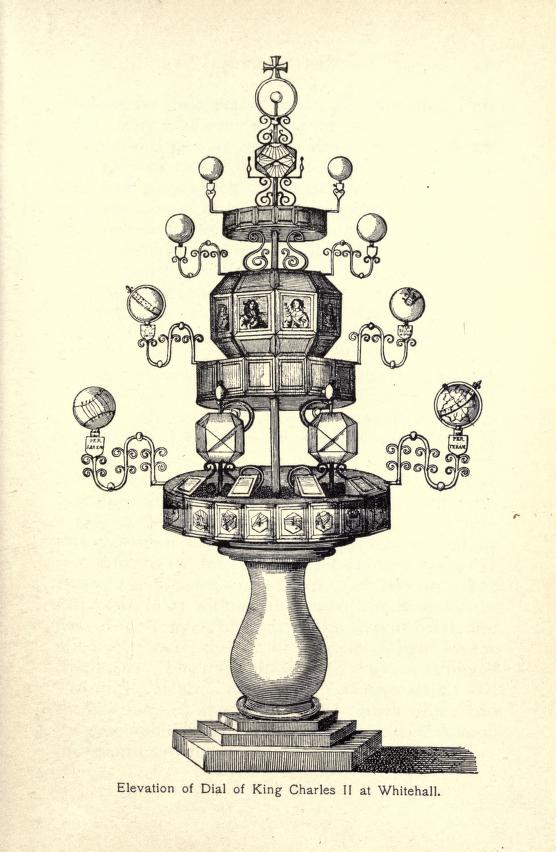
Francis Line’s dial for Whitehall Palace, illustration copied from a work by William Leybourn.

The year 1669 in science and technology involved some significant events.

== Astronomy ==
- February 23 – Isaac Newton writes his first description of his new invention, the reflecting telescope.
- Geminiano Montanari detects the variability of the eclipsing binary Algol.
- Jean Picard begins measurement of 1 degree of Earth's meridian arc in France.

== Biology ==
- Marcello Malpighi publishes Dissertatio Epistolica de Bombyce in London, a study of Bombyx mori which is the first published monograph on an invertebrate.
- Robert Morison publishes Praeludia Botanica, emphasising use of the structure of a plant's fruits for its classification.
- Francis Willughby and John Ray publish "Experiments concerning the motion of sap in trees, made this spring".
- Jan Swammerdam publishes Historia Insectorum Generalis in the Netherlands, explaining the process of metamorphosis in insects.

== Chemistry ==
- Phosphorus is discovered by German alchemist Hennig Brand, the first chemical element to be discovered that was not known since ancient times.

== Geology ==
- Nicolas Steno puts forward his theory that sedimentary strata had been deposited in former seas, and that fossils are organic in origin.

== Mathematics ==
- October 29 – Isaac Newton is appointed Lucasian Professor of Mathematics at the University of Cambridge.

== Physics ==
- Rasmus Bartholin publishes his observation of the birefringence of a light ray by Iceland spar (calcite).
- Robert Boyle publishes A Continuation of New Experiments Physico-mechanical, Touching the Spring and Weight of the Air, and Their Effects.

== Physiology and medicine ==
- Richard Lower publishes his Tractatus de Corde on the workings of the heart.
- The Chinese traditional herbal medicine company Tong Ren Tang (同仁堂) is established in Beijing by imperial physician Yue Xianyang.

== Publications ==
- Isaac Barrow publishes Lectiones Opticæ et Geometricæ in London.

== Births ==
- May 26 – Sébastien Vaillant, French botanist (died 1722)

== Deaths ==
- April 12 – Abdias Treu, German mathematician (born 1597)
- c. April – Nicasius le Febure, French-born royal chemist, alchemist and apothecary (born 1615)
