= 1672 in science =

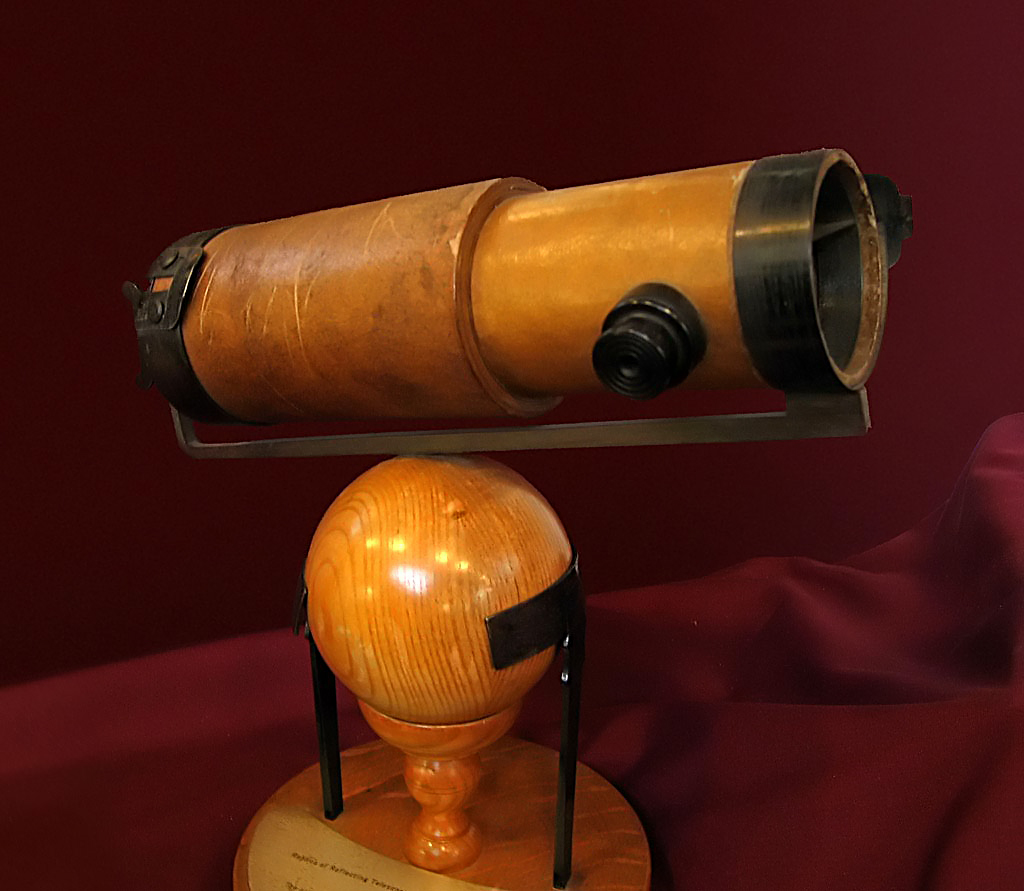
A replica of Isaac Newton’s second reflecting telescope of 1672.

The year 1672 in science and technology involved some significant events.

== Astronomy ==
- February 6 – Isaac Newton submits his first paper on optics to the Royal Society of London.
- December 23 – Giovanni Cassini discovers Rhea, a satellite of Saturn.
- John Flamsteed determines the solar parallax from observations of Mars.

== Botany ==
- Robert Morison publishes Plantarum Umbelliferarum Distributio Nova, per Tabulas Cognationis et Affinitatis, ex Libra Naturae observata et detecta, the first monograph devoted to a specific group of plants, the Umbelliferae.

== Mathematics ==
- Georg Mohr publishes the Mohr–Mascheroni theorem, that any geometric construction that can be performed by a compass and straightedge can be performed by a compass alone.

== Medicine ==
- Paul Barbette publishes Opera omnia medica et chirurgica.
- Richard Lower publishes De Catarrhis, the first scholarly attempt by an English physician to take a classical doctrine (the theory that nasal catarrh is caused by secretions overspilling from the brain) and to disprove it by scientific experiment.
- Dutch physician Regnier de Graaf describes the female reproductive system.
- Isbrand van Diemerbroeck publishes the first edition of his Anatome corporis humani in Utrecht.
- Thomas Willis publishes the earliest English work on medical psychology, Two Discourses concerning The Soul of Brutes, Which is that of the Vital and Sensitive of Man.

== Technology ==
- Dutch painter Jan van der Heyden improves the fire hose, with his brother Nicolaes, a hydraulic engineer.

== Institutions ==
- January 11 – Isaac Newton is elected a Fellow of the Royal Society of London and it then demonstrates his reflecting telescope to King Charles II of England.

== Births ==
- February 13 – Étienne François Geoffroy, French chemist (died 1731)
- August 2 – Johann Jakob Scheuchzer, Swiss natural historian (died 1733)
- Ann Baynard, English natural philosopher (died 1697)

== Deaths ==
- March – Peter Blondeau, French-born pioneer of mechanised minting of coin
- April 26 – Lionel Lockyer, English quack doctor (born c. 1600)
- July 3 – Francis Willughby, English ornithologist and ichthyologist, pleurisy (born 1635)
- November 19 – John Wilkins, English bishop and natural philosopher, co-founder of the Royal Society (born 1614)
- late – Semyon Dezhnev, Pomor navigator who in 1648 made the first recorded voyage through the Bering Strait (born c. 1605)
