= 1673 in science =

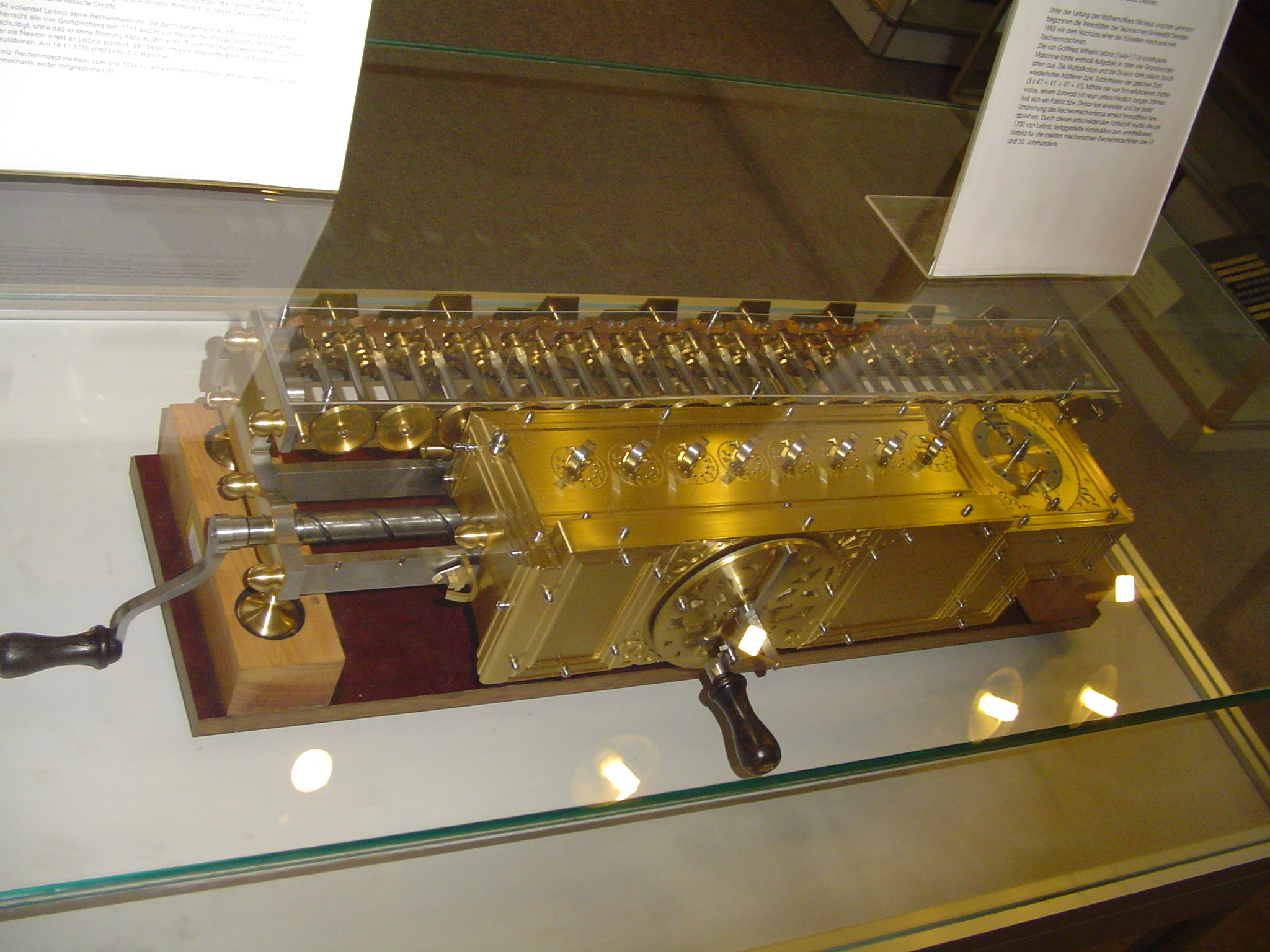
The Staffelwalze, or Stepped Reckoner, a digital calculating machine invented by Gottfried Wilhelm Leibniz around 1673 and built around 1700, on display in the Technische Sammlungen museum in Dresden, Germany.

The year 1673 in science and technology involved some significant events.

== Mathematics ==
- John Kersey begins publication of The Elements of that Mathematical Art Commonly Called Algebra.
- Gottfried Wilhelm Leibniz rediscovers the arctangent series and obtains the Leibniz formula for π as the special case.
- Samuel Morland publishes A Perpetual Almanack and Several Useful Tables.

== Microbiology ==
- Antonie van Leeuwenhoek's observations with the microscope are first published in Philosophical Transactions of the Royal Society.

== Physics ==
- Christiaan Huygens publishes his mathematical analysis of the pendulum, Horologium Oscillatorium sive de motu pendulorum.

== Births ==
- August 10 – Johann Konrad Dippel, German theologian, alchemist and physician (died 1734)
- August 11 – Richard Mead, English physician (died 1754)

== Deaths ==
- May 6 – Werner Rolfinck, German scientist (born 1599)
- August 17 – Regnier de Graaf, Dutch physician and anatomist who discovered the ovarian follicles (born 1641)
- December 15 – Margaret Cavendish, Duchess of Newcastle-upon-Tyne, English natural philosopher (born 1623)
