= 1670 in science =

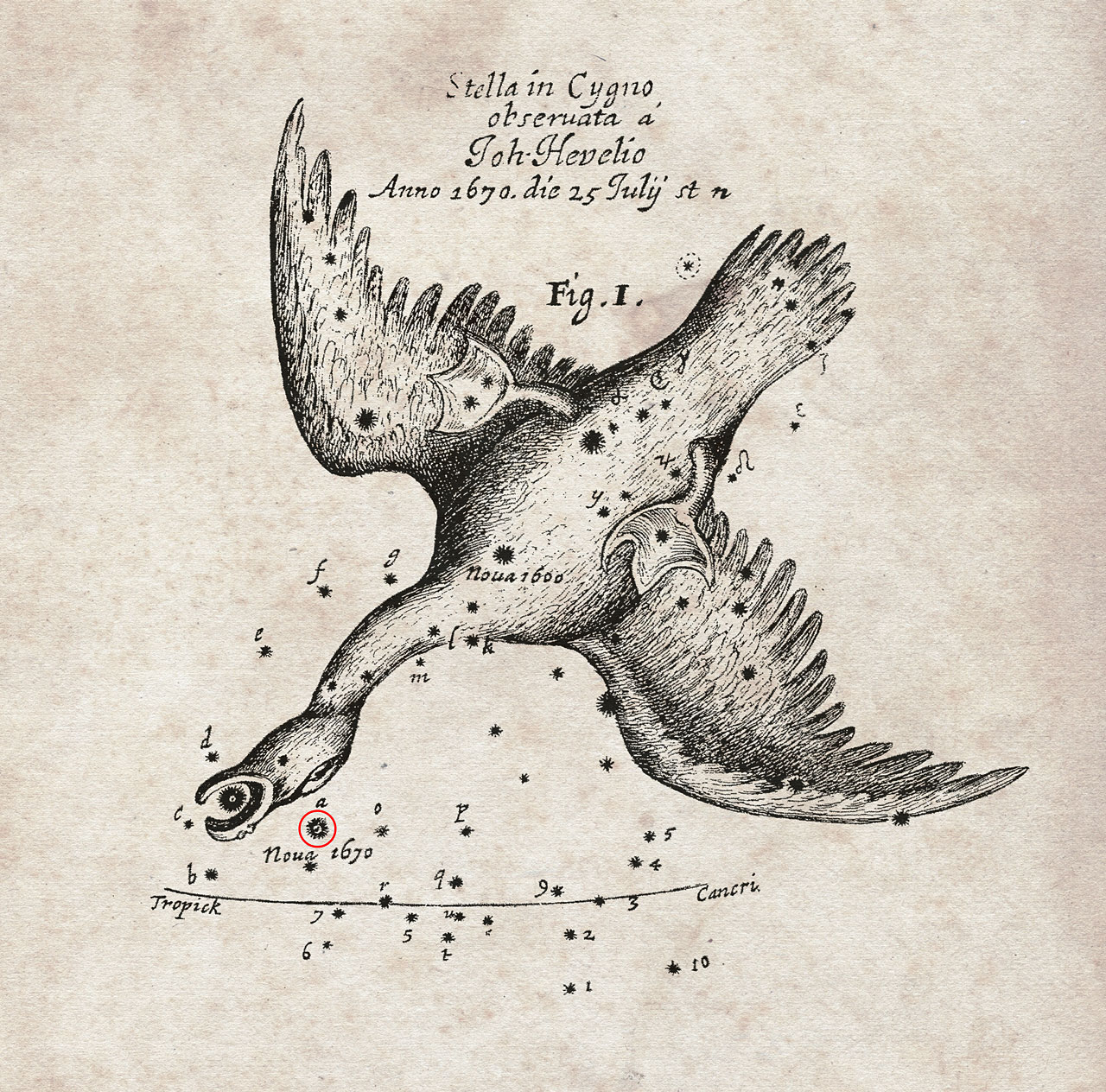
Nova chart by Johannes Hevelius, appearing in the 1670 edition of the journal Philosophical Transactions, published by the Royal Society in England

The year 1670 in science and technology involved some significant events.

== Botany ==
- John Ray publishes Catalogus plantarum Angliæ, the basis of all later floras of England.
- The predecessor of the Royal Botanic Garden Edinburgh is opened as a physic garden by Drs Robert Sibbald and Andrew Balfour in Holyrood, Edinburgh, Scotland.

== Earth sciences ==
- Jean Picard calculates the Earth radius to within 0.44% of the modern value.
- Agostino Scilla publishes La vana speculazione disingannata dal senso: lettera risponsiva c. i corpi marini, che petrificati si trovano in varii luoghi terrestri ("Vain Speculation Undeceived by Sense") in Naples, arguing for an organic origin for fossils.

== Technology ==
- The first longcase clock is built in England by William Clement.

== Births ==
- February 25 – Maria Margarethe Kirch born Winckelmann, German astronomer (died 1720)

== Deaths ==
- March 10 – Johann Rudolf Glauber, German chemist (born 1604)
- May 21 – Niccolò Zucchi, Italian astronomer (born 1586)
