= 1721 in science =

List of years in science	(table)
- … 1711; 1712; 1713; 1714; 1715; 1716; 1717; 1718; 1719; 1720; 1721; 1722; 1723; 1724; 1725; 1726; 1727; 1728; 1729; 1730; 1731 …
- Art; Archaeology; Architecture; Literature; Music; Philosophy; Science; +...

The year 1721 in science and technology involved some significant events.

== Medicine ==
- The use of ether is developed as a pain-killer.
- Lady Mary Wortley Montagu introduces the Ottoman Turkish method of inoculation against smallpox – variolation – to London.
- Thomas Guy founds Guy's Hospital in London to treat "incurables" discharged from St Thomas'.

== Psychology ==
- A suggestion box is developed under the eighth shōgun of Japan, Yoshimune Tokugawa.

== Technology ==
- Richard Newsham of London obtains his first patent for a manual fire pump.

== Deaths ==
- September 11 – Rudolf Jakob Camerarius, German botanist (born 1665)
