= 1787 in science =

List of years in science	(table)
- … 1777; 1778; 1779; 1780; 1781; 1782; 1783; 1784; 1785; 1786; 1787; 1788; 1789; 1790; 1791; 1792; 1793; 1794; 1795; 1796; 1797 …
- Art; Archaeology; Architecture; Literature; Music; Philosophy; Science; +...

The year 1787 in science and technology involved some significant events.

== Astronomy ==
- January 11 – William Herschel discovers Titania and Oberon, the first moons of Uranus found.
- February 19 – First light for William Herschel's 40-foot telescope under construction at Observatory House, Slough, England.
- Caroline Herschel is granted an annual salary of £50 by King George III of Great Britain for acting as assistant to her brother William in astronomy.

== Biology ==
- William Curtis begins publication of The Botanical Magazine; or Flower-Garden Displayed in London. As Curtis's Botanical Magazine, it will still be published into the 21st century.
- Spanish physician Francisco Xavier Cid publishes Tarantismo Observado en España, a study of tarantulas and the tarantella as a cure for their bite.
- King George III of Great Britain, writing as Ralph Robinson of Windsor, contributes to Arthur Young's Annals of Agriculture.

== Chemistry ==
- Guyton de Morveau, Jean-Henri Hassenfratz, Antoine François, Antoine Lavoisier, Pierre Adet and Claude Berthollet publish Méthode de nomenclature chimique in Paris.
- Jacques Charles proposes Charles's law, a corollary of Boyle's law, describes relationship between temperature and volume of a gas.

== Physics ==
- Ernst Chladni publishes Entdeckungen über die Theorie des Klanges, demonstrating modes of vibration.
- Jean-Paul Marat publishes the first French translation of Newton's 'Opticks'

== Surveying ==
- The first great theodolite constructed by Jesse Ramsden for the Anglo-French Survey (1784–1790) linking the observatories of Paris and Greenwich.

== Technology ==
- June – William Symington patents improvements to the Watt steam engine.
- c. July – John Wilkinson launches an iron barge in the English Midlands.
- August 27 – Launching a 45-foot (14 m) steam-powered craft on the Delaware River, John Fitch demonstrates the first United States patent for his design.
- December 3 – James Rumsey demonstrates a water-jet propelled boat on the Potomac.
- First production of all-iron edge rail (for underground colliery rail transport), at Plymouth Ironworks, Merthyr Tydfil, South Wales.
- First introduction of a plateway, underground at Sheffield Park Colliery, Yorkshire, England, by John Curr.
- William Chapman designs a segmental skew arch at Finlay Bridge, Naas, on the Kildare Canal in Ireland.
- Levi Hutchins of New Hampshire produces a mechanical alarm clock.

== Awards ==
- Copley Medal: John Hunter

== Births ==
- January 24 – Christophe-Paulin de La Poix de Fréminville (died 1848), French explorer and naturalist.
- March 6 – Joseph von Fraunhofer (died 1826), Bavarian physicist.
- March 8 – Karl Ferdinand von Graefe (died 1840), Polish-born German surgeon.
- March 9 – Josephine Kablick (died 1863), Czech botanist and paleontologist.
- March 28 – Claudius James Rich (died 1821), British archaeologist and anthropologist.
- March 29 – Carl Philipp Sprengel (died 1859), German botanist.
- April 24 – Mathieu Orfila (died 1853), Spanish-born French physician and chemist.
- May 27 – Benjamin Valz (died 1867), French astronomer.
- June 2 – Nils Gabriel Sefström (died 1845), Swedish chemist and mineralogist.
- June 3 – Auguste Le Prévost (died 1859), French geologist, philologist, archaeologist and historian.
- June 4 – Constant Prévost (died 1856), French geologist.
- June 7 – William Conybeare (died 1857), English geologist.
- June 27 – Thomas Say (died 1834), American naturalist.
- August 16 – Jean Michel Claude Richard (died 1868), French botanist.
- August 24 – James Weddell (died 1834), Flemish-born Anglo-Scots seal hunter and Antarctic explorer.
- September 5 – François Sulpice Beudant (died 1850), French mineralogist et geologist.
- September 15 – Guillaume-Henri Dufour (died 1875), Swiss engineer et topographer.
- November 5 – John Richardson (died 1865), Scottish naturalist, explorer and surgeon.
- November 9 – Johann Natterer (died 1843), Austrian naturalist.
- November 18 – Louis Daguerre (died 1851), French inventor.
- December 17 – John Forbes (died 1861), Scottish physician
- December 17 (or 18) – Jan Evangelista Purkinje (died 1869), Czech anatomist et neurophysiologist.
- Undated – Pierre Charles Alexandre Louis (died 1872), French physician.

== Deaths ==
- February 13 – Ruđer Bošković, Ragusan physicist, mathematician and astronomer (born 1711)
- May 10 – William Watson, English physician, botanist and physicist (born 1715)
