= 1722 in science =

List of years in science	(table)
- … 1712; 1713; 1714; 1715; 1716; 1717; 1718; 1719; 1720; 1721; 1722; 1723; 1724; 1725; 1726; 1727; 1728; 1729; 1730; 1731; 1732 …
- Art; Archaeology; Architecture; Literature; Music; Philosophy; Science; +...

The year 1722 in science and technology involved some significant events.

== Chemistry ==
- René Antoine Ferchault de Réaumur publishes his work on metallurgy, L'Art de convertir le fer forge en acier, which describes how to convert iron into steel.

== Exploration ==
- April 5 (Easter Sunday) – Jacob Roggeveen lands on Easter Island.

== Mathematics ==
- Abraham de Moivre states de Moivre's formula, connecting complex numbers and trigonometry.

== Meteorology ==
- A continuous series of weather records is begun in Uppsala by Anders Celsius; it will be maintained for at least 300 years.

== Physics ==
- Willem 's Gravesande publishes experimental evidence that the formula for kinetic energy of a body in motion is
  $$E_k \propto \begin{matrix} \end{matrix} mv^2$$.

== Technology ==
- October – In clockmaking, George Graham demonstrates that his experiments, begun in December 1721, with mercurial compensation of the pendulum result in greater accuracy in timekeeping under conditions of variable temperature.

== Births ==
- May 11 – Petrus Camper, Dutch comparative anatomist (died 1789)
- November 19 – Leopold Auenbrugger, Austrian physician (died 1809)
- December 28 – Eliza Lucas, American agronomist (died 1793)
- Thomas Barker, English meteorologist (died 1809)

== Deaths ==
- May 20 – Sébastien Vaillant, French botanist (born 1669)
