= 1720 in science =

| List of years in science | (table) |
- … 1710; 1711; 1712; 1713; 1714; 1715; 1716; 1717; 1718; 1719; 1720; 1721; 1722; 1723; 1724; 1725; 1726; 1727; 1728; 1729; 1730 …
- Art; Archaeology; Architecture; Literature; Music; Philosophy; Science; +...

The year 1720 in science and technology involved some significant events.

== Astronomy ==
- February 10 – Edmond Halley is appointed as Astronomer Royal of England.

== Medicine ==
- May – First patient admitted to the Westminster Public Infirmary, predecessor of St George's Hospital, London.
- Dr Steevens' Hospital is established at Kilmainham, Dublin.
- Great Plague of Marseille, the last major outbreak of bubonic plague in Europe.
- English physician Richard Mead publishes A Short Discourse concerning Pestilential Contagion, and the Method to be used to prevent it.

== Physics ==
- Willem 's Gravesande publishes Physices elementa mathematica, experimentis confirmata, sive introductio ad philosophiam Newtonianam, an introduction to Newtonian physics, in Leiden.

== Technology ==
- A theodolite is developed by Jonathan Sisson of England.
- Pinchbeck is invented by English watchmaker Christopher Pinchbeck; it is an alloy of 83% copper and 17% zinc, creating a strong, hard-wearing metal which has the appearance and weight of 20 carat gold.
- An early chronograph is invented which has only mechanical parts in it.
- Henry de Saumarez (of the Channel Islands) produces an instrument called the Marine Surveyor intended to measure a ship's velocity.
- A single-action five-pedal harp is developed by Jacob Hochbrucker of Bavaria which can raise the pitch of the selected strings by a half step.
- approx. date – Joseph Williamson uses a differential gear in a clock.

== Births ==
- January 30 – Charles De Geer, Swedish industrialist and entomologist (died 1778)
- March 13 – Charles Bonnet, Genevan naturalist and philosophical writer (died 1793)
- July 18 – Gilbert White, English naturalist (died 1793)
- October 8 – Geneviève Thiroux d'Arconville, French novelist, translator and chemist (d. 1805)
- November 5 – Jean Baptiste Christophore Fusée Aublet, French pharmacist and botanist (died 1778)
- December ? – James Hargreaves, English inventor (died 1778)
- approx. date – Dmitry Ivanovich Vinogradov, Russian chemist and (died 1758)

== Deaths ==
- December 29 – Maria Margarethe Kirch, German astronomer (born 1670)
- David Gregory, Scottish physician and inventor (born 1625)
