= 1785 in science =

List of years in science	(table)
- … 1775; 1776; 1777; 1778; 1779; 1780; 1781; 1782; 1783; 1784; 1785; 1786; 1787; 1788; 1789; 1790; 1791; 1792; 1793; 1794; 1795 …
- Art; Archaeology; Architecture; Literature; Music; Philosophy; Science; +...

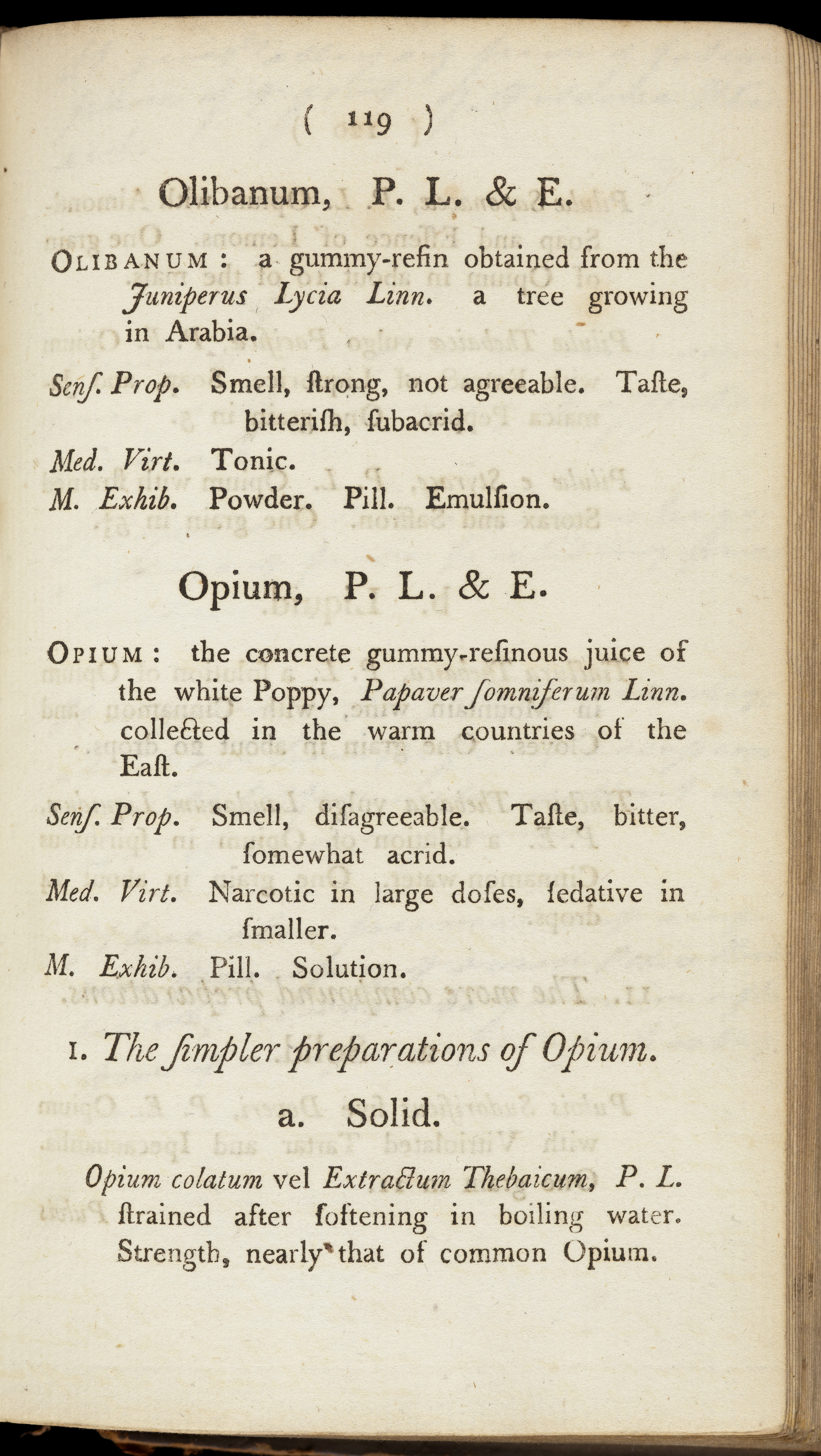

The year 1785 in science and technology involved some significant events.

== Astronomy ==
- Dunsink Observatory established near Dublin.

== Aviation ==
- January 7 – Frenchman Jean-Pierre Blanchard and American John Jeffries travel from Dover, England to Calais, France in a gas balloon, becoming the first to cross the English Channel by air.
- January 19 – Richard Crosbie successfully flies in a hot air balloon across Dublin, the first ascent in Ireland.

== Biology ==
- Antoine François and Étienne Louis Geoffroy publish Entomologia Parisiensis, sive, Catalogus insectorum quae in agro Parisiensi reperiuntur ....
- John Stuart, 3rd Earl of Bute, publishes Botanical Tables, containing the different families of British plants.

== Earth sciences ==
- March 7–July – James Hutton's Theory of the Earth is first presented, at the Royal Society of Edinburgh.

== Exploration ==
- André Michaux is sent by the French government to North America to look for new plants.

== Mathematics ==
- The Marquis de Condorcet publishes Essai sur l'application de l'analyse á la probabilité des décisions rendues á la pluralité des voix including his voting paradox, the Condorcet method of voting and his jury theorem.

== Medicine ==
- William Withering publishes An Account of the Foxglove and some of its Medical Uses.
- John Aikin publishes A Manual of Materia Medica, Containing a Brief Account of All the Simples Directed in the London and Edinburgh Dispensatories, with Their Several Preparations and the Principal Compositions into which They Enter.
- A form of chainsaw is first illustrated by Scottish doctor John Aitken, for use in symphysiotomy.
- London Hospital Medical College opens as England's first chartered medical school.

== Physics ==
- Charles-Augustin de Coulomb first publishes Coulomb's law.

== Technology ==
- Lionel Lukin patents a rescue lifeboat in Great Britain.
- Approximate date – American inventor Oliver Evans erects a fully automated flour mill capable of operating continuously through the pioneering use of bulk material handling devices including bucket elevators, conveyor belts, and Archimedean screws at Greenbank Mill, in New Castle County, Delaware – "He practically invented the modern science of handling materials."

== Awards ==
- Copley Medal: William Roy

== Births ==
- January 15 – William Prout, English chemist (died 1850)
- February 26 – Anna Sundström, Swedish chemist (died 1871)
- March 17 – Ellen Hutchins, Irish botanist (died 1815)
- March 22 – Adam Sedgwick, English geologist (died 1873)
- April 26 – John James Audubon, Haitian-born American naturalist, illustrator (died 1851)
- July 6 – William Jackson Hooker, English botanist (died 1865)

== Deaths ==
- January 23 – Matthew Stewart, Scottish mathematician (born 1717)
- June 2 – Jean Paul de Gua de Malves, French mathematician (born 1713)
- November 16 – Johan Gottschalk Wallerius, Swedish chemist and mineralogist (born 1709)
- December 12 – Edmé-Louis Daubenton, French naturalist (born 1730)
- Pierre Le Roy, French clockmaker (born 1717)
- Saverio Manetti, Italian natural historian (born 1723)
- undated – Faustina Pignatelli, Italian mathematician (born 1705)
