= 1723 in science =

List of years in science	(table)
- … 1713; 1714; 1715; 1716; 1717; 1718; 1719; 1720; 1721; 1722; 1723; 1724; 1725; 1726; 1727; 1728; 1729; 1730; 1731; 1732; 1733 …
- Art; Archaeology; Architecture; Literature; Music; Philosophy; Science; +...

The year 1723 in science and technology involved some significant events.

== Geophysics ==
- George Graham discovers diurnal variation in Earth's magnetic field.
- Antoine de Jussieu publishes De l'Origine et des usages de la Pierre de Foudre on the origins of fossils, prehistoric stone tools and meteorites.

== Optics ==
- Giacomo F. Maraldi makes the first observation of the Arago spot, unrecognized at this time.

== Births ==
- January 5 – Nicole-Reine Lepaute, French astronomer (died 1788)
- January 31 – Petronella Johanna de Timmerman, Dutch scientist (died 1786)
- February 17 – Tobias Mayer, German cartographer, astronomer and physicist (died 1762)
- April 30 – Mathurin Jacques Brisson, French zoologist (died 1806)
- November 12 – Saverio Manetti, Italian natural historian (died 1785)

== Deaths ==
- August 26 – Anton van Leeuwenhoek, Dutch pioneer of the microscope (born 1632)
