= 1789 in science =

List of years in science	(table)
- … 1779; 1780; 1781; 1782; 1783; 1784; 1785; 1786; 1787; 1788; 1789; 1790; 1791; 1792; 1793; 1794; 1795; 1796; 1797; 1798; 1799 …
- Art; Archaeology; Architecture; Literature; Music; Philosophy; Science; +...

The year 1789 in science and technology involved some significant events.

== Anatomy ==
- Antonio Scarpa publishes Anatomicæ disquisitiones de auditu et olfactu, a classic treatise on the hearing and olfactory organs.

== Astronomy ==
- August 28 and September 17 – William Herschel discovers Saturn's moons Enceladus and Mimas, which he describes to the Royal Society of London on November 12.
- Maximilian Hell establishes the constellations Tubus Hershelli Major and Minor in honour of Herschel's discovery of Uranus (constellations obsolete by 1930).

== Botany ==
- Erasmus Darwin publishes his poem The Loves of the Plants, a popular rendering of Linnaeus' works.
- Antoine Laurent de Jussieu publishes Genera Plantarum: secundum ordines naturales disposita, juxta methodum in Horto regio parisiensi exaratam, anno M.DCC.LXXIV, providing a basis for the system of natural classification of flowering plants largely still in use.

== Chemistry ==
- Antoine Lavoisier's Traité élémentaire de chimie presents a unified view of new theories of chemistry, containing a clear statement of the law of conservation of mass, defining the nature of elements and denying the existence of phlogiston. He also helps establish the scientific journal Annales de chimie which will still be published into the 21st century.
- German chemist Martin Heinrich Klaproth discovers the element Uranium while studying the mineral pitchblende.

== Exploration ==
- July 10 – Alexander Mackenzie reaches the Mackenzie River Delta.

== Mathematics ==
- The Slovene mathematician Jurij Vega presents his approximation of π to 140 decimal places of which the first 126 are correct, a feat not exceeded for more than half a century.

== Medicine ==
- February 4 – James Parkinson gives the first description of human injury from lightning strikes, in a paper read to the Medical Society of London.
- Andrew Duncan delivers the first lectures on forensic medicine in Britain, at the University of Edinburgh.

== Technology ==
- Rev. Dr. Edmund Cartwright patents his first practical power loom in England and designs a wool combing machine.
- William Wouldhave demonstrates a self-righting rescue lifeboat on the River Tyne in England.

== Zoology ==
- Swiss naturalist François Huber devises the "leaf hive" for the cultivation of honey bees.

== Awards ==
- Copley Medal: William Morgan

== Births ==
- January 3 – Carl Gustav Carus, German physiologist and landscape painter (died 1869)
- February 26 – Eaton Hodgkinson, English structural engineer (died 1861)
- March 16 – Georg Ohm, German physicist (died 1854)
- August 21 – Augustin-Louis Cauchy, French mathematician (died 1857)
- September 4 – Charles Gaudichaud-Beaupré, French botanist (died 1854)
- September 28 – Richard Bright, English physician (died 1858)
- October 8 – William Swainson, English naturalist (died 1855)
- October 25 – Heinrich Schwabe, German astronomer (died 1875)

== Deaths ==
- April 7 – Petrus Camper, Dutch comparative anatomist (born 1722)
- May 25 – Anders Dahl, Swedish botanist for whom the dahlia is named (born 1751)
- undated – Angélique du Coudray, French pioneer of modern midwifery (born 1712)
