= 1788 in science =

List of years in science	(table)
- … 1778; 1779; 1780; 1781; 1782; 1783; 1784; 1785; 1786; 1787; 1788; 1789; 1790; 1791; 1792; 1793; 1794; 1795; 1796; 1797; 1798 …
- Art; Archaeology; Architecture; Literature; Music; Philosophy; Science; +...

The year 1788 in science and technology involved some significant events.

== Astronomy ==
- December 21 – Caroline Herschel discovers the periodic comet 35P/Herschel–Rigollet.

== Biology ==
- Dr. Edward Jenner publishes his observation that it is the newly hatched common cuckoo which pushes its host's eggs and chicks out of the nest.
- James E. Smith founds the Linnean Society of London.
- Utamaro publishes Ehon Mushi Erami ("Picture Book of Crawling Creatures") in Japan with color illustrations.
- Thomas Walter publishes Flora Caroliniana, the first flora of North America to follow Linnaean taxonomy.
- Gilbert White publishes The Natural History and Antiquities of Selborne, in the County of Southampton (dated 1789), a pioneering observational study of English ecology.

== Earth sciences ==
- James Hutton's Theory of the Earth; or an Investigation of the Laws observable in the Composition, Dissolution, and Restoration of Land upon the Globe is published for the first time, in Transactions of the Royal Society of Edinburgh.

== Mechanics ==
- Lagrange's Mécanique analytique is published in Paris, introducing Lagrangian mechanics.

== Medicine ==
- December 5 – Rev. Dr. Francis Willis is called in to advise on treatment of the mental condition of King George III of the United Kingdom.

== Technology ==
- February 1 – Isaac Briggs and William Longstreet patent a steamboat in the United States.
- October 14 – William Symington demonstrates a paddle steamer on Dalswinton Loch in Scotland.

== Awards ==
- Copley Medal: Charles Blagden

== Births ==
- March 7 – Antoine César Becquerel, French scientist (died 1878)
- March 22 – Pierre Joseph Pelletier, French chemist (died 1842)
- April 18 – Charlotte Murchison, Scottish geologist (died 1869)
- May 10 – Augustin-Jean Fresnel, French physicist (died 1827)
- July 1 – Jean-Victor Poncelet, French mechanical and military engineer and mathematician (died 1867)
- July 23 – Prideaux John Selby, English ornithologist (died 1867)
- September 12 – Charlotte von Siebold, German gynecologist (died 1859)
- October 14 – Edward Sabine, Anglo Irish physicist, astronomer and explorer (died 1883)
- December 21 – Thomas Southwood Smith, English physician and sanitary reformer (died 1861)
- James Murray, Irish physician (died 1871)

== Deaths ==
- April 16 – Georges-Louis Leclerc, Comte de Buffon, French naturalist (born 1707)
- May 8 – Giovanni Antonio Scopoli, Italian-Austrian naturalist (born 1723)
- October 17 – John Brown, Scottish-born physician (born 1735)
- December 6 - Nicole-Reine Lepaute, French astronomer (born 1723)
- Lucia Galeazzi Galvani, Italian scientist (born 1743)
- approx. date – Moses Harris, English entomologist and engraver (born 1730)
