= 1727 in science =

List of years in science	(table)
- … 1717; 1718; 1719; 1720; 1721; 1722; 1723; 1724; 1725; 1726; 1727; 1728; 1729; 1730; 1731; 1732; 1733; 1734; 1735; 1736; 1737 …
- Art; Archaeology; Architecture; Literature; Music; Philosophy; Science; +...

The year 1727 in science and technology involved some significant events.

== Astronomy ==
- Maharaja Jai Singh II begins construction of the Jantar Mantar observatory at Jaipur.

== Biology ==
- Rev. Stephen Hales publishes Vegetable Staticks, containing an account of key experiments in plant physiology; and makes the first measurement of blood pressure.

== Mathematics ==
- This year's French Academy of Sciences prize is based on a problem on the masting of ships: to calculate the number of masts to use and where in the ship to locate them. Pierre Bouguer gains the award for his paper On the masting of ships; and two other prizes, one for his dissertation On the best method of observing the altitude of stars at sea and the other for his paper On the best method of observing the variation of the compass at sea. The 19-year-old Euler enters for the prize with an essay written in 1726 and published in 1728.

== Optics ==
- Eyeglasses, with side pieces that rest on the ears, are invented by Englishman Edward Scarlett.

== Pharmacology ==
- Elizabeth Gooking Greenleaf opens an apothecary shop in Boston, Massachusetts, the first woman to so practice in America.

== Other events ==
- The kilt is invented by Thomas Rawlinson, the English owner of an ironworks, who designs it as a cheap uniform for better maneuverability around machinery. Ian MacDonnel of Glengarry adopts the garment along with his clansmen, and the kilt is worn throughout the Highlands by 1745.

== Births ==
- March 19 – Ferdinand Berthoud, Swiss clockmaker and maker of scientific instruments (died 1807)
- April 7 – Michel Adanson, French botanist (died 1806)

== Deaths ==
- March 31 – Isaac Newton, English physicist and mathematician (born 1643)
- March 22 – Johann Leonhard Rost, German astronomer (born 1688)
