= 1733 in science =

List of years in science	(table)
- … 1723; 1724; 1725; 1726; 1727; 1728; 1729; 1730; 1731; 1732; 1733; 1734; 1735; 1736; 1737; 1738; 1739; 1740; 1741; 1742; 1743 …
- Art; Archaeology; Architecture; Literature; Music; Philosophy; Science; +...

The year 1733 in science and technology involved some significant events.

== Physiology and medicine ==
- Rev. Stephen Hales publishes Hæmastaticks, the second volume of his Statical Essays, in London, containing the results of his experiments in measuring blood pressure.

== Inventions ==
- May 26 – The flying shuttle loom is patented by John Kay, making weaving faster and increasing demand for yarn.
- The perambulator or pram (a baby carriage) is invented by English architect William Kent for children of the 3rd Duke of Devonshire.
- The achromatic refracting lens is invented by English barrister Chester Moore Hall.

== Mathematics ==
- Giovanni Gerolamo Saccheri studies what geometry would be like if the parallel postulate (Euclid's fifth) were false.
- Abraham de Moivre introduces the normal distribution to approximate the binomial distribution in probability.

== Births ==
- January 18 – Kaspar Friedrich Wolff, German surgeon and physiologist (died 1794)
- February 19 – Daniel Solander, Swedish botanist (died 1782)
- March 13 – Joseph Priestley, English chemist (died 1804)
- March 17 – Carsten Niebuhr, Danish cartographer, surveyor and traveller (died 1815)
- May 4 – Jean-Charles de Borda, French mathematician, physicist, political scientist, and sailor (died 1799)
- May 22 – Alexander Monro, Scottish anatomist (died 1817)
- July 27 – Jeremiah Dixon, English surveyor and astronomer (died 1779)

== Deaths ==
- June 23 – Johann Jakob Scheuchzer, Swiss natural historian (born 1672)
