= 1866 in science =

List of years in science	(table)
- … 1856; 1857; 1858; 1859; 1860; 1861; 1862; 1863; 1864; 1865; 1866; 1867; 1868; 1869; 1870; 1871; 1872; 1873; 1874; 1875; 1876 …
- Art; Archaeology; Architecture; Literature; Music; Philosophy; Science; +...

The year 1866 in science and technology involved some significant events, listed below.

== Astronomy ==
- May – William Huggins studies the emission spectrum of a nova and discovers that it is surrounded by a cloud of hydrogen.
- June 4 – Pluto (not known at this time) reaches its only aphelion between 1618 and 2113.
- Giovanni Schiaparelli realizes that meteor streams occur when the Earth passes through the orbit of a comet that has left debris along its path.

== Biology ==
- Gregor Mendel publishes his laws of inheritance.
- Ernst Haeckel challenges the plant/animal division of life, observing that single celled organisms, the protists, do not fit into either category.
- Élie Metchnikoff describes the early separation of "polecells" (progenital cells) in parthenogenetic Diptera.
- Robert John Lechmere Guppy discovers the guppy (fish) in Trinidad.
- Frederick Smith first discovers Formica candida in the Bournemouth district of England, describing it as Formica gagates.
- Nikolai Kaufman publishes his Moscow Flora.

== Chemistry ==
- Dynamite invented by Alfred Nobel.
- August von Hofmann proposes the now standard system of hydrocarbon nomenclature and invents the Hofmann voltameter.
- Emil Erlenmeyer proposes that naphthalene has a structure of two fused benzene rings.

== Earth sciences ==
- January 26 – Volcanic eruption in the Santorini caldera begins.

== Mathematics ==
- The second smallest pair of amicable numbers (1184, 1210) is discovered by teenager B. Nicolò I. Paganini.

== Medicine ==
- February 21 – Lucy Hobbs Taylor becomes the world's first woman to receive a doctorate from a dental college (Ohio College of Dental Surgery).
- July – Elizabeth Garrett Anderson opens the St Mary's Dispensary in London where women can seek medical advice from exclusively female practitioners.
- Max Schultze discovers two sorts of 'receptors' in the retina.
- Dr John Langdon Down publishes his theory that different types of mental condition can be classified by ethnic characteristics, notably "Mongolism", the genetic developmental disability now known as Down syndrome.
- Invention of a clinical thermometer by Thomas Clifford Allbutt.
- A cholera epidemic in London causes over 5,000 deaths.
- Patrick Manson starts a school of tropical medicine in Hong Kong.

== Paleontology ==
- American paleontologist Joseph Leidy describes the new genus and species Laelaps aquilunguis, demonstrating that theropod dinosaurs walked on their hind limbs rather than on all fours as in earlier reconstructions.

== Physics ==
- James Clerk Maxwell formulates the Maxwell–Boltzmann distribution in the kinetic theory of gases.

== Technology ==
- January 12 – Royal Aeronautical Society is formed as 'The Aeronautical Society of Great Britain' in London, the world's oldest such society.
- July 27 – The SS Great Eastern successfully completes laying the transatlantic telegraph cable between Valentia Island, Ireland and Heart's Content, Newfoundland, permanently restoring a communications link.
- August 23 – Ralph H. Twedell patents the hydraulic riveter in the United Kingdom.

== Awards ==
- Copley Medal: Julius Plücker
- Wollaston Medal for Geology: Charles Lyell

== Births ==
- February 1 – Agda Meyerson (died 1924), Swedish nurse and healthcare profession activist
- February 8 – Moses Gomberg (died 1947), Russian-born chemist
- February 14 – Victor Despeignes (died 1937), French pioneer of radiation oncology
- February 26 – Herbert Henry Dow (died 1930), Canadian-born chemist
- April 17 – Ernest Starling (died 1927), English physiologist
- July 13 – Emily Winifred Dickson (died 1944), Irish-born gynaecologist
- July 25 – Frederick Blackman (died 1947), English plant physiologist
- September 13 – Arthur Pollen (died 1937), English inventor
- September 21 – H. G. Wells (died 1946), English scientific populariser
- September 25 – Thomas Hunt Morgan (died 1945), American biologist, Nobel laureate in Physiology
- October 8 – Reginald Fessenden (died 1932), Canadian pioneer of radio broadcasting
- November 11 – Martha Annie Whiteley (died 1956), English chemist and mathematician
- November 30 – Robert Broom (died 1951), Scottish-born paleontologist
- December 7 – Maude Delap (died 1953), Irish marine biologist

== Deaths ==
- March 6 – William Whewell (born 1794), English scientist, philosopher and historian of science
- March 14 – Alexander Morison (born 1779), Scottish physician and psychiatrist
- April 4 – William Dick (born 1793), Scottish veterinarian
- April 5 – Thomas Hodgkin (born 1798), English physician
- July 20 – Bernhard Riemann (born 1826), German-born mathematician
- September 16 – François Mêlier (born 1798), French physician
- October 18 – Philipp Franz von Siebold (born 1796), German physician, botanist and traveler in Japan
- December 1 – George Everest (born 1790), British surveyor and geographer
