= 1725 in science =

List of years in science	(table)
- … 1715; 1716; 1717; 1718; 1719; 1720; 1721; 1722; 1723; 1724; 1725; 1726; 1727; 1728; 1729; 1730; 1731; 1732; 1733; 1734; 1735 …
- Art; Archaeology; Architecture; Literature; Music; Philosophy; Science; +...

The year 1725 in science and technology involved some significant events.

== Astronomy ==
- James Bradley first observes stellar aberration.
- John Flamsteed's Historia Coelestis Britannica is published posthumously in a version containing Flamsteed's revisions, thanks largely to the efforts of his widow, Margaret, and former assistants Abraham Sharp and Joseph Crosthwaite.

== History of science ==
- John Freind (physician) begins publication of The History of Physick, from the time of Galen to the beginning of the 16th century, chiefly with regard to practice, the first comprehensive history of medicine in English.

== Mathematics ==
- The binary numeral system is invented by Basile Bouchon.
- The construction of a 4x4 Graeco-Latin square is published as a puzzle involving playing cards by Jacques Ozanam in Recreation mathematiques et physiques, vol. IV.
- Pierre Varignon's Nouvelle Méchanique ou Statique, published posthumously in Paris, includes recognizable planar dual graphs.

== Technology ==
- Stereotype printing, a copying process, is developed by Scottish goldsmith William Ged. The concept later generates the word "stereotyping".
- The ocular Harpsichord, or clavecin oculaire, comprising a 6-foot square frame above a normal harpsichord, is invented by the Jesuit mathematician and physicist Father Louis-Bertrand Castel. No illustrations of it remain.

== Births ==
- February 4 – Dru Drury, English entomologist (died 1804)
- May 10 – John Hope, Scottish physician and botanist (died 1786)
- May 23 – Robert Bakewell, English agriculturalist and geneticist (died 1795)
- September 16 – Nicolas Desmarest, French naturalist (died 1815)
- September 25 – Nicolas-Joseph Cugnot, French mechanical engineer (died 1804)
- September 27 – Patrick d'Arcy, Irish-born mathematician (died 1779)
