= 1699 in architecture =

The year 1699 in architecture involved some significant architectural events and new buildings.

== Buildings and structures ==
=== Buildings ===
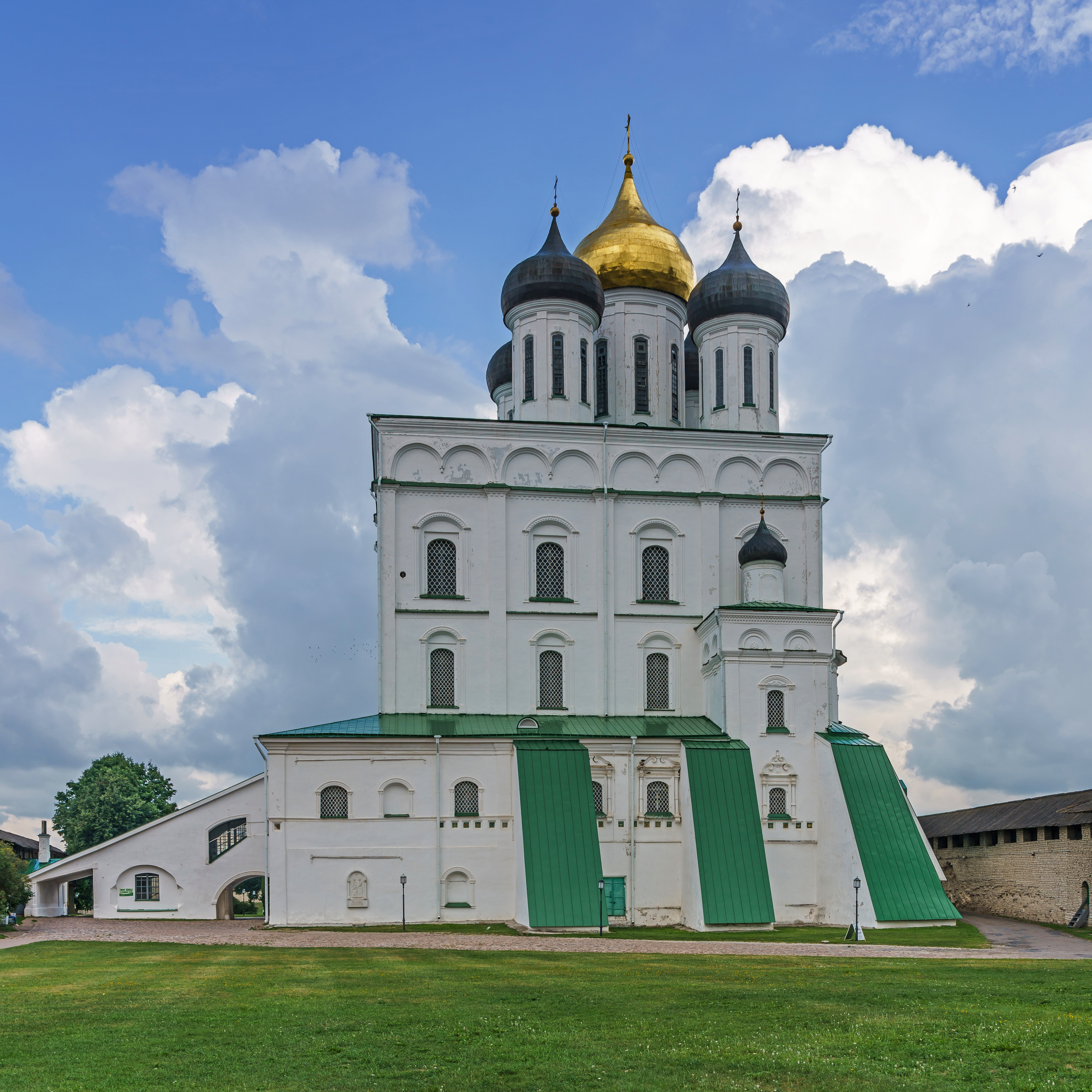
Trinity Cathedral in Pskov

- English architect and dramatist John Vanbrugh is commissioned to begin Castle Howard in Yorkshire.
- Craigiehall, Scotland, designed by Sir William Bruce and James Smith, is completed for William Johnstone, 1st Marquess of Annandale
- St Werburgh's Church, Derby, England
- Thomas Lambert House, Rowley, Massachusetts completed
- Trinity Cathedral in Pskov, Russia completed

== Births ==
- February 10 – Francisco Hurtado Izquierdo, Spanish Baroque architect (died 1725)
- February 17 – Georg Wenzeslaus von Knobelsdorff, Prussian painter and architect (died 1753)
- date unknown
  - Matthew Brettingham, English Palladian country and town house architect (died 1769)
  - Edward Lovett Pearce, Irish Palladian architect (died 1733)

== Deaths ==
- November – Stephen Manwaring, North Carolina architect (born c.1640)
