= 1730 in science =

List of years in science	(table)
- … 1720; 1721; 1722; 1723; 1724; 1725; 1726; 1727; 1728; 1729; 1730; 1731; 1732; 1733; 1734; 1735; 1736; 1737; 1738; 1739; 1740 …
- Art; Archaeology; Architecture; Literature; Music; Philosophy; Science; +...

The year 1730 in science and technology involved some significant events.

== Astronomy ==
- The analemma is developed by the French astronomer Grandjean de Fouchy.

== Mathematics ==
- James Stirling publishes Methodus differentialis, sive tractatus de summatione et interpolatione serierum infinitarum.

== Physics ==
- The Reaumur scale is developed by French naturalist René Antoine Ferchault de Réaumur, with 0° = the freezing point of water and 80° = the boiling point.

== Technology ==
- Joseph Foljambe of Rotherham, England, produces the iron-clad Rotherham swing plough.

== Births ==
- April 15 – Moses Harris, English entomologist and engraver (died c. 1788)
- July 12 – Anna Barbara Reinhart, Swiss mathematician (died 1796)
- June 26 – Charles Messier, French astronomer (died 1817)
- August 12 – Edmé-Louis Daubenton, French naturalist (died 1785)
- December 8
  - Johann Hedwig, Transylvanian-born German botanist (died 1799)
  - Jan Ingenhousz, Dutch physiologist (died 1799)
- Maria Angela Ardinghelli, Italian scientific translator (died 1825)
- between 1730 and 1732 – William Hudson, English botanist (died 1793)

== Deaths ==
- January 18 – Antonio Vallisneri, Italian physician and natural scientist (born 1661)
- April 21 - Jan Palfijn, Flemish surgeon and obstetrician (born 1650)
- December 5 (bur.) – Alida Withoos, Dutch botanical artist (born c. 1661/1662)
