= 1729 in science =

List of years in science	(table)
- … 1719; 1720; 1721; 1722; 1723; 1724; 1725; 1726; 1727; 1728; 1729; 1730; 1731; 1732; 1733; 1734; 1735; 1736; 1737; 1738; 1739 …
- Art; Archaeology; Architecture; Literature; Music; Philosophy; Science; +...

The year 1729 in science and technology involved some significant events.

== Astronomy ==
- January 9 & 16 – James Bradley, in a letter written to Edmond Halley and read before the Royal Society, describes his discovery of aberration of starlight.
- August 1 – Fr. Nicolas Sarrabat, a professor of mathematics at Marseille, discovers the Comet of 1729, possibly the largest comet, with the highest apparent magnitude, on record.
- English optician Chester Moore Hall (1703–1771) develops an achromatic lens (or achromat) commonly used as the objective of small refracting telescopes.

== Biology ==
- June 8 – The Botanic Gardens of Pamplemousses on Mauritius are started by Pierre Barmond.
- Mark Catesby begins part publication in London of The Natural History of Carolina, Florida and the Bahama Islands, containing the figures of birds, beasts, fishes, serpents, insects, and plants ... together with their descriptions in English and French, the first published account of the flora and fauna of North America, and the first work of natural history to use folio-size coloured plates.

== Mathematics ==
- Andrew Motte publishes The Mathematical Principles of Natural Philosophy in London, the first English translation of Isaac Newton's Philosophiæ Naturalis Principia Mathematica (originally published 1687; Motte translated the 1726 edition).

== Medicine ==
- August 6 – Royal Infirmary of Edinburgh established as the "Hospital for the Sick Poor" or "Physicians' Hospital" in Edinburgh (Scotland).

== Physics ==
- Stephen Gray discovers electrical conduction.
- Pierre Bouguer publishes Essai d'optique sur la gradation de la lumière, defining the quantity of light lost by passing through a given extent of the Earth's atmosphere, thus making some of the earliest measurements in photometry and becoming the first known discoverer of what becomes known as the Beer–Lambert law.

== Technology ==
- Stephen Switzer publishes An Introduction to a General System of Hydrostaticks and Hydraulicks in London, a 2-volume general treatise on hydraulics.
- Walter Churchman of Bristol (England) patents the first mechanical cocoa bean grinder.

== Births ==
- January 12 – Lazzaro Spallanzani, Italian biologist (died 1799)
- January 31 – Pehr Löfling, Swedish Linnaean botanist (died 1756)
- September 15 – Mikiel'Ang Grima, Maltese surgeon (died 1798)
- November 11 – Louis Antoine de Bougainville, French explorer (died 1811)

== Deaths ==
- January 31 – Jacob Roggeveen, Dutch explorer (born 1659)
- March 2 – Francesco Bianchini, Italian philosopher and scientist (born 1662)
- August 5 – Thomas Newcomen, English inventor (born 1664)
- December 1 – Giacomo F. Maraldi, French-Italian astronomer (born 1665)
