= 1937 in science =

The year 1937 in science and technology involved some significant events, listed below.

== Astronomy ==
- June 8 – First total solar eclipse to exceed 7 minutes of totality in over 800 years; visible in the Pacific and Peru.

== Biology ==
- September 27 – Last definite record of a Bali tiger shot.
- Meredith Crawford first publishes results of the cooperative pulling paradigm, with chimpanzees in the United States.
- Jay Laurence Lush publishes the influential textbook Animal Breeding Plans in the United States.
- The citric acid cycle is finally identified by Hans Adolf Krebs.

== Chemistry ==
- Carlo Perrier and Emilio Segrè at the University of Palermo confirm discovery of the chemical element which will become known as Technetium.
- The opioid Methadone is synthesized in Germany by scientists working at Hoechst AG.
- Otto Bayer and his coworkers at IG Farben in Leverkusen, Germany, first make polyurethanes.

== Computer science ==
- January – Alan Turing's 1936 paper "On Computable Numbers" first appears in print. Alonzo Church's review of it in Journal of Symbolic Logic introduces the term Turing machine.
- Claude Shannon's Master's thesis at MIT demonstrates that electronic application of Boolean algebra could construct and resolve any logical numerical relationship.
- Konrad Zuse submits patents in Germany based on his Z1 computer design anticipating von Neumann architecture.

== Exploration ==
- British Graham Land Expedition (1934–1937) concludes its work, having determined that Graham Land is an integral part of the Antarctic Peninsula and not an independent archipelago.

== Mathematics ==
- Bruno de Finetti publishes "La Prévision: ses lois logiques, ses sources subjectives" in Annales de l'Institut Henri Poincaré, his most influential treatment of his theorem on exchangeable sequences of random variables.
- Hans Freudenthal proves the Freudenthal suspension theorem in homotopy.
- Goldberg polyhedron first described.

== Medicine ==
- November 2 – English chemist Montague Phillips at May & Baker synthesises sulphapyridine (M&B 693), an early antibiotic which immediately enters animal trials with Middlesex Hospital pathologist Lionel Whitby.
- First typhus vaccine by Rudolf Weigl, Ludwik Fleck and Hans Zinsser; influenza vaccine by Anatolii Smorodintsev.
- Both respirator designed in Australia.
- Italian psychiatrist Amarro Fiamberti is the first to document a transorbital approach to the brain, which becomes the basis for the controversial medical procedure of transorbital lobotomy.
- Publication in the United Kingdom of Dr A. J. Cronin's novel The Citadel, promoting the cause of socialised medicine.

== Physics ==
- January – Albert Einstein and Nathan Rosen publish a paper denying that gravitational waves can exist.
- Eugene Wigner introduces the term isospin.

== Technology ==
- February – Hans von Ohain begins ground-testing a turbojet engine.
- April 12 – Frank Whittle ground-tests the first jet engine designed to power an aircraft, at Rugby, England.
- May 28 – Rocker Shovel Loader patent applied for in the United States.
- June 5 – Alan Blumlein is granted a patent for an ultra-linear amplifier.
- December 13 – Tomlinson Moseley files the first patent for an electric toothbrush.
- Alec Reeves invents pulse-code modulation.

== Awards ==
- Nobel Prizes
  - Physics – Clinton Joseph Davisson, George Paget Thomson
  - Chemistry – Walter Haworth, Paul Karrer
  - Medicine – Albert von Szent-Györgyi Nagyrapolt
- Copley Medal – Henry Dale
- Wollaston Medal for geology – Waldemar Lindgren

== Births ==
- January 14 – Leo Kadanoff (died 2015), American physicist.
- January 26 – Igor Aleksander, Croatian computer scientist.
- February 18 – Chen Chuangtian (died 2018), Chinese materials scientist.
- March 16 – Amos Tversky (died 1996), Jewish American cognitive and mathematical psychologist, recipient of the Nobel Memorial Prize in Economic Sciences.
- April 17 – Don Buchla (died 2016), American electronic engineer, pioneer of sound synthesizers.
- May 9 – Alison Jolly (died 2014), American primatologist.
- May 13 – Trevor Baylis (died 2018), English inventor.
- June 4 – Richard Robson, English-born Australian chemist, recipient of the Nobel Prize in Chemistry.
- June 8 – Bruce McCandless II (died 2017), American astronaut.
- June 9 – Harald Rosenthal, German biologist
- June 11 – David Mumford, American mathematician.
- June 21 – Averil Mansfield, English vascular surgeon.
- June 23 – Nicholas Shackleton (died 2006), English Quaternary geologist and paleoclimatologist, recipient of the Vetlesen Prize.
- June 26 – Robert Coleman Richardson (died 2013), American experimental physicist, recipient of the Nobel Prize in Physics.
- July 1 – Lydia Makhubu, Swazi chemist.
- July 18 – Roald Hoffmann, né Safran, Polish-American theoretical chemist, poet and playwright, recipient of the Nobel Prize in Chemistry.
- July 19 – Bibb Latané, American social psychologist.
- July 26 – Ernest Vinberg (died 2020), Russian mathematician.
- August 2 – Coenraad Bron (died 2006), Dutch computer scientist.
- September 8 – Edna Adan Ismail, Somali pioneer of pediatrics.
- December 26 – John Horton Conway (died 2020), English-b4orn m4athematician.

== Deaths ==
- January 28 – Arthur Pollen (born 1866), English inventor.
- January 29 – Aleen Cust (born 1868), Irish veterinary surgeon.
- February 5 – Lou Andreas-Salomé (born 1861), German psychoanalyst.
- May 28 – Alfred Adler (born 1870), Austrian psychotherapist.
- June 11 – R. J. Mitchell (born 1895), English aeronautical engineer.
- July 20 – Guglielmo Marconi (born 1874), Italian inventor.
- July 30 – Victor Despeignes (born 1866), French pioneer of radiation oncology.
- October 16 – William Sealy Gosset (born 1876), English statistician.
- October 19 – Ernest Rutherford (born 1871), New Zealand-born British physicist and laureate of the Nobel Prize in Physics.
- November 23 – Jagadish Chandra Bose (born 1858), Bengali physicist.
