= 1946 in science =

The year 1946 in science and technology involved some significant events, listed below.

== Astronomy ==
- January 10 – The United States Army Signal Corps' Project Diana bounces radar waves off the Moon.
- Reginald Aldworth Daly of Harvard University first proposes a giant impact hypothesis to account for formation of the Moon.

== Biology ==
- Summer – Ottenby Bird Observatory begins to function on the Swedish island of Öland.
- November 10 – Peter Scott opens the Slimbridge Wetland Reserve in England.
- December 2 – The International Convention for the Regulation of Whaling is signed in Washington, D.C. to "provide for the proper conservation of whale stocks and thus make possible the orderly development of the whaling industry" through establishment of the International Whaling Commission.
- Karl von Frisch publishes "Die Tänze der Bienen" ("The dances of the bees").
- Edmund Jaeger discovers and later documents, in The Condor, a state of extended torpor, approaching hibernation, in a bird, the common poorwill.

== Cartography ==
- The Chamberlin trimetric projection is developed by Wellman Chamberlin for the National Geographic Society.

== Chemistry ==
- The structure of the alkaloid strychnine is determined by English organic chemist Robert Robinson.

== Computer science ==
- February 14–15 – ENIAC, the first non-classified all-electronic Turing complete computer, built under the direction of J. Presper Eckert and John Mauchly, is announced and dedicated at the University of Pennsylvania's Moore School of Electrical Engineering. It is programmable by plugboard and uses conditional branching.
- December 11 – Frederic Calland Williams receives a patent for a random-access memory device.

== Earth sciences ==
- Arthur Holmes estimates the age of the Earth, using uranium–lead dating.

== Mathematics ==
- June – Joseph Berkson describes Berkson's paradox.
- The Blanuša snarks (two snarks with 18 vertices) are discovered in graph theory by Danilo Blanuša.

== Medicine ==
- July 14 – Dr. Benjamin Spock's The Common Sense Book of Baby and Child Care is first published in New York; it becomes one of the biggest best-sellers of all time.
- Harold Gillies begins to perform sex reassignment surgery on Michael Dillon, including the first phalloplasty for a trans man.
- Chance Brothers of Smethwick, England, produce the first all-glass syringe with interchangeable barrel and plunger, allowing easy mass-sterilisation of components.
- Alfred Gilman, with Frederick S. Philips, first publish the results of trials of anti-cancer chemotherapy, using mechlorethamine, carried out with Louis S. Goodman.

== Physics ==
- January 1 – Atomic Energy Research Establishment established at Harwell, Oxfordshire under John Cockcroft.
- May 21 – Manhattan Project physicist Louis Slotin accidentally triggers a fission reaction at the Los Alamos National Laboratory and gives himself a lethal dose of hard radiation, making him the second victim of a criticality accident in history.
- The BBGKY hierarchy of equations for s-particle distribution functions is applied to the derivation of kinetic equations by Nikolay Bogolyubov in a paper received in July 1945 and published in 1946 in Russian and in English. The related kinetic transport theory is considered by John Gamble Kirkwood in a paper received in October 1945 and published in March 1946. The first paper by Max Born and Herbert S. Green considering a general kinetic theory of liquids is received in February 1946 and published on 31 December 1946.

== Technology ==
- July 24 – First Martin-Baker ejection seat live-tested from a jet aircraft over England.

== Awards ==
- Nobel Prizes
  - Physics – Percy Williams Bridgman
  - Chemistry – James B. Sumner, John Howard Northrop, Wendell Meredith Stanley
  - Medicine – Hermann Joseph Muller

== Births ==
- February 26 – Ahmed Zewail (died 2016), Egyptian-born "father of femtochemistry", recipient of the Nobel Prize in Chemistry
- May 10 – Biruté Galdikas (died 2026), German-born Canadian primatologist
- May 11 – Robert Jarvik (died 2025), American co-inventor of the Jarvik-7 artificial heart
- June 13 – Paul L. Modrich, American biochemist, recipient of the Nobel Prize in Chemistry
- June 24 – Ellison Onizuka (killed 1986), American astronaut
- July 2 – Richard Axel, American physiologist, recipient of the Nobel Prize in Physiology or Medicine
- August 2 – Nigel Hitchin, English mathematician
- August 5 – Shirley Ann Jackson, African American physicist
- August 11 – Marilyn vos Savant, American polymath
- September 7 – Francisco Varela (died 2001), Chilean-born biologist and philosopher
- September 8 – Aziz Sancar, Turkish biochemist, recipient of the Nobel Prize in Chemistry
- September 9 – Adrian Smith, English statistician, President of the Royal Society
- September 28 – Morinobu Endo, Japanese chemist
- October 14 – Kay Redfield Jamison, American clinical psychologist
- October 17 – Carol Dweck, American social psychologist
- October 29 – Peter Barnes, English respiratory scientist
- December 31 – Roy Porter (died 2002), English medical historian
- Faiza Al-Kharafi, Kuwaiti electrochemist

== Deaths ==
- March 8 – Frederick W. Lanchester (born 1868), English automotive engineer.
- March 23 – Gilbert N. Lewis (born 1875), American chemist; first to isolate deuterium.
- March 26 – Gerhard Heilman (born 1859), Danish paleo-ornithologist.
- May 2 – Simon Flexner (born 1863), American pathologist and bacteriologist.
- June 14 – John Logie Baird (born 1888), Scottish-born inventor.
- August 13 – H. G. Wells (born 1866), English novelist and scientific populariser.
- September 16 – James Jeans (born 1877), English mathematician and scientist.
- October 2 – Ignacy Mościcki (born 1867), chemist and President of Poland.
- October 4 – Barney Oldfield (born 1878), American automobile racer.
- December 2 – Hilda Lyon (born 1896), English aeronautical engineer.
- Israel Aharoni (born 1882), Russian-born Jewish zoologist.
