= 1861 in science =

The year 1861 in science and technology involved some significant events, listed below.

== Astronomy ==
- May 13 – Comet C/1861 J1 (the "Great Comet of 1861") first observed from Australia by John Tebbutt.

== Biology ==
- Anton de Bary publishes his first work on fungi, describing sexual reproduction in Peronospora.
- Charles Thorp, Archdeacon of Durham (d. 1862), arranges purchase of some of the Farne Islands off the north-east coast of England and employment of a warden to protect threatened seabird species.

== Chemistry ==
- March 30 – William Crookes announces his discovery of thallium.
- Rubidium is discovered by Robert Bunsen and Gustav Kirchhoff, in Heidelberg, Germany, in the mineral lepidolite through the use of their spectroscope.
- Aleksandr Butlerov is instrumental in creating the theory of chemical structure.
- Josef Loschmidt publishes Chemische Studien, proposing two-dimensional representations for over 300 molecules and recognising variations in atomic size.
- Ernest Solvay develops the Solvay process for the manufacture of soda ash (sodium carbonate).

== Earth sciences ==
- Eduard Suess proposes the former existence of the supercontinent Gondwana.

== History of science and technology ==
- Boulton and Watt rotative beam engine of 1788 from the makers' Soho Foundry in the west midlands of England is acquired for the Museum of Patents, predecessor of the Science Museum, London.
- First volumes of Munk's Roll published.

== Medicine and physiology ==
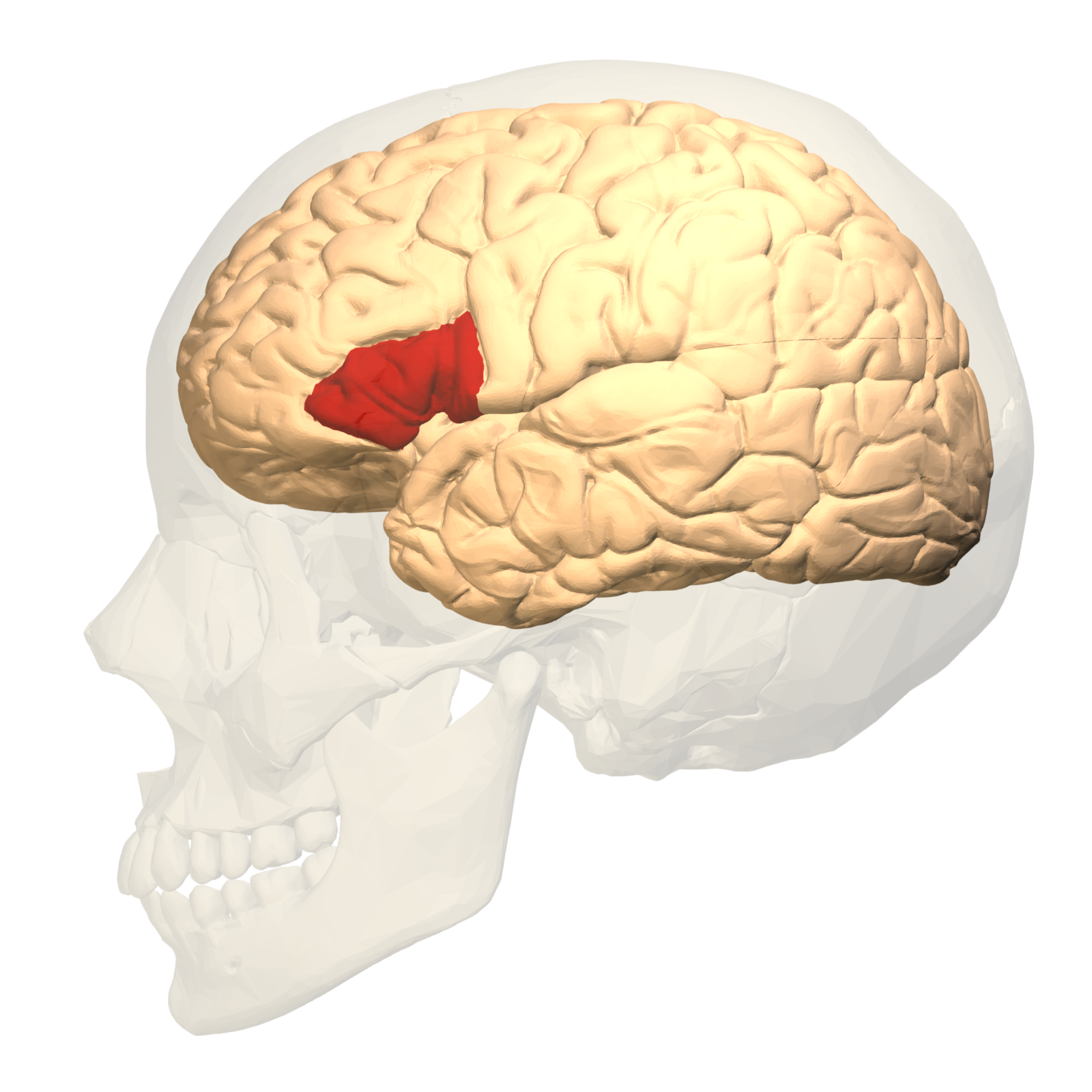
Broca's area (in red)

- Paul Broca identifies the speech production center of the brain.
- Franciscus Donders introduces the term visual acuity.
- Guillaume Duchenne describes Duchenne muscular dystrophy.
- Prosper Ménière reports the association of vertigo with inner ear disorders.
- Ádám Politzer publishes the technique of Politzerization used in otorhinolaryngology.
- Ignaz Semmelweis publishes Etiology, Concept and Prophylaxis of Childbed Fever (Die Ätiologie, der Begriff und die Prophylaxis des Kindbettfiebers), a treatment of his theory on sanitary conditions during childbirth.
- Adolf Zsigmondy develops a dental notation system.

== Paleontology ==
- August 15 – First description of Archaeopteryx, based on a feather found in Bavaria; in September the first complete identified skeleton is found near Langenaltheim in Germany.

== Technology ==
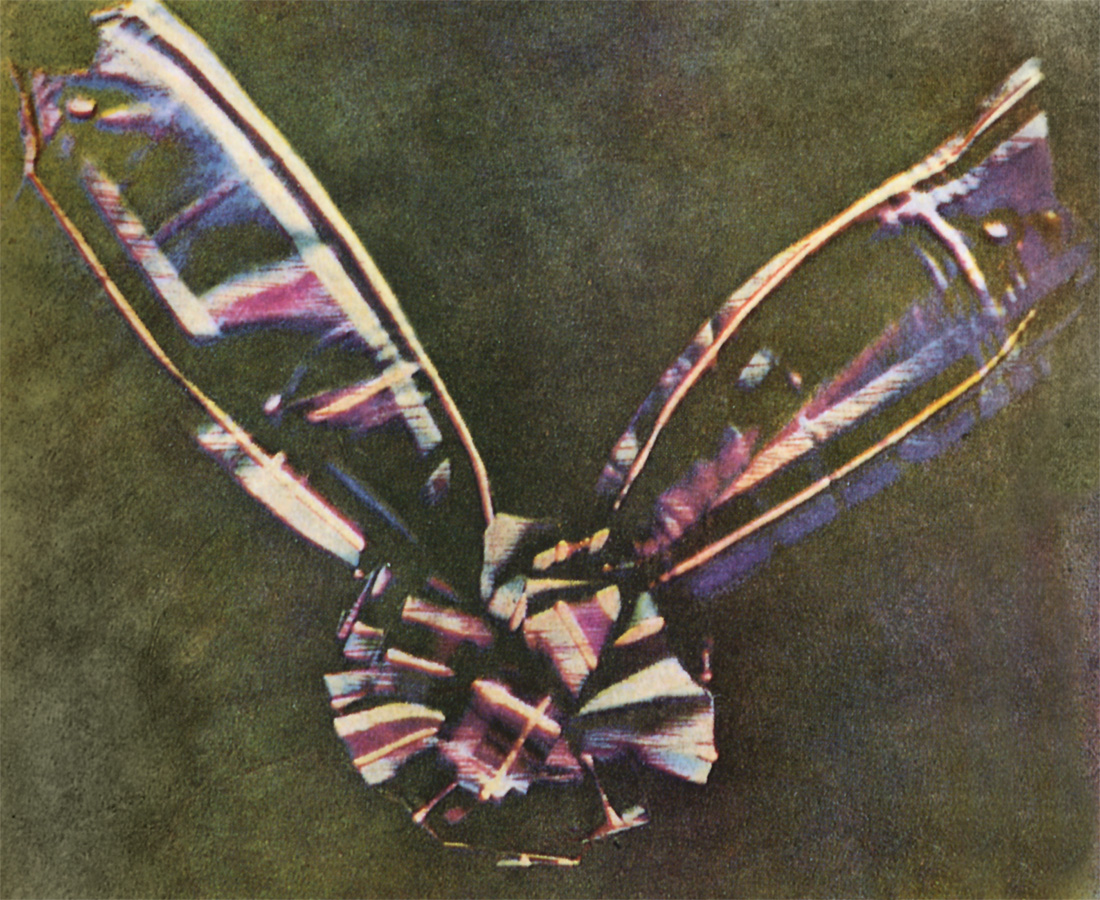
The first colour photograph presented by James Clerk Maxwell

- January 1 – First steam-powered carousel recorded, in Bolton, England.
- May 17 – Scottish-born physicist James Clerk Maxwell demonstrates the principle of permanent three-colour photography in a lecture at the Royal Institution in London using a photograph captured by Thomas Sutton.
- July 23 – The term 'drive shaft' is used in the description of the mechanism in a patent reissue for the Watkins and Bryson horse-drawn mowing machine.
- William Froude publishes the first results of his research into ship hull design.
- Dr. Richard J. Gatling invents the Gatling gun.
- Capt. Robert P. Parrott is granted a United States patent for the Parrott rifle, a field artillery weapon.
- German scientist Philipp Reis succeeds in creating a device that captures sound and converts it to electrical impulses which are transmitted via electrical wires to another device that transforms these pulses into recognizable sounds similar to the original acoustical source. Reis coins the term telephone to describe his device, the Reis telephone.

== Publications ==
- Michael Faraday's Royal Institution Christmas Lectures published as The Chemical History of a Candle.

== Awards ==
- Copley Medal: Louis Agassiz
- Wollaston Medal for geology: Heinrich Bronn

== Births ==
- February 12 – Lou Andreas-Salomé, born Luíza von Salomé (died 1937), Russian-born psychoanalyst.
- February 15
  - Charles Édouard Guillaume (died 1938), French physicist, recipient of the Nobel Prize in Physics.
  - Alfred North Whitehead (died 1947), English mathematician.
- April 24 – Hedda Andersson (died 1950), Swedish physician.
- May 5 – Peter Cooper Hewitt (died 1921), American electrical engineer and inventor.
- May 20 – Henry Gantt (died 1919), American project engineer.
- June 9 – Pierre Duhem (died 1916), French philosopher of science.
- June 20 – Frederick Hopkins (died 1947), British biochemist, recipient of the Nobel Prize for Physiology or Medicine.
- July 7 – Nettie Stevens (died 1912), American geneticist.
- July 18 – Kadambini Ganguly (died 1923), Indian physician.
- July 26 – Ægidius Elling (died 1949), Norwegian gas turbine pioneer.
- August 4 – Henry Head (died 1940), English neurologist.
- August 9 – Dorothea Klumpke (died 1942), American astronomer.
- August 10 – Almroth Wright (died 1947), English bacteriologist and immunologist.
- October 11 – John Bell Hatcher (died 1904), American paleontologist.
- December 17 – Arthur E. Kennelly (died 1939), Irish American electrical engineer.

== Deaths ==
- January 3 – Arnold Adolph Berthold (born 1803), German physiologist.
- May 16 – John Stevens Henslow (born 1796), English botanist.
- June 13 – Henry Gray (born 1827), English anatomist (smallpox).
- June 18 – Eaton Hodgkinson (born 1789), English structural engineer.
- November 10 – Isidore Geoffroy Saint-Hilaire (born 1805), French zoologist.
- November 13 – Sir John Forbes (born 1787), Scottish-born royal physician.
- December 10 – Thomas Southwood Smith (born 1788), English physician and sanitary reformer.
- Ferdinand Deppe (born 1794), German naturalist, explorer and painter.
