= 1947 in science =

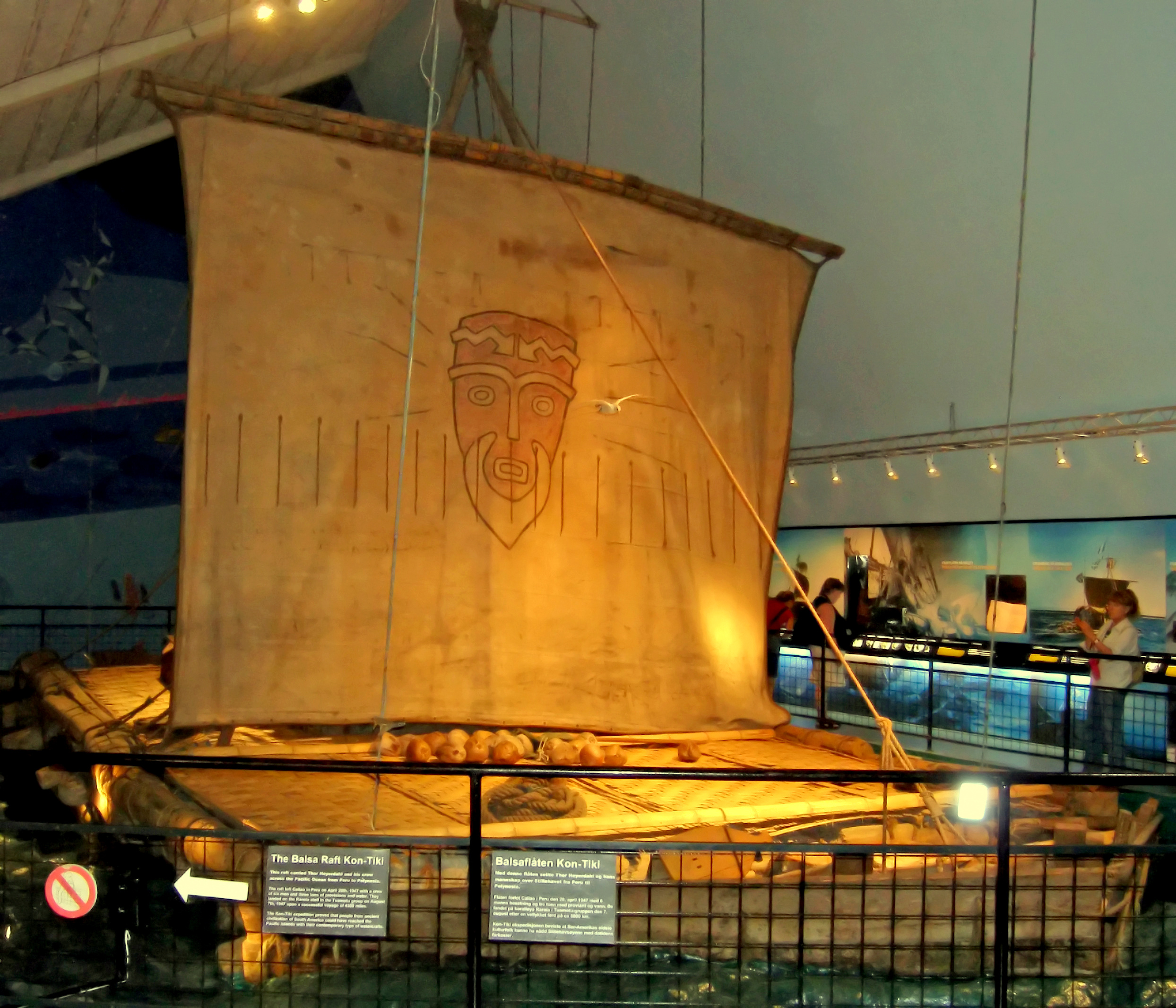
The Kon-Tiki raft, a pre-Columbian style raft built in 1947 by Thor Heyerdahl and used to sail from Peru to Tuamotus, French Polynesia

The year 1947 in science and technology involved some significant events, listed below.

== Anthropology ==
- August 7 – Thor Heyerdahl's balsa-wood raft, the Kon-Tiki, smashes into the reef at Raroia in the Tuamotu Islands after a 101-day, 4300-mile (6900-km) journey across the Pacific Ocean, demonstrating that prehistoric peoples could have traveled from South America.

== Astronomy and space exploration ==
- February 12 – Sikhote-Alin meteorite falls to Earth in Siberia, the largest iron meteorite known to have impacted.
- February 20 – The first living things sent into space (and returned) are fruit flies, accompanied by rye and cotton seeds, aboard a V-2 rocket launched by the U.S. Army Ordnance Corps which reaches an altitude of 68 miles (109 km).
- Bok globules are reported.

== Biology ==
- The Oxford Swift Research Project, based on the colony at the Oxford University Museum of Natural History, is started by David and Elizabeth Lack. It will still be running more than sixty years later.
- David Lack publishes Darwin's Finches.
- Zika virus first isolated from a rhesus macaque in the Zika Forest of Uganda.
- Influenza C virus first isolated.

== Computer science ==
- January 25 – Thomas T. Goldsmith Jr. and Estle Ray Mann file a United States patent request for an invention described as a "cathode-ray tube amusement device", probably the first video game.
- July 29 – After being shut off on November 9, 1946, for a refurbishment and relocation, ENIAC, one of the world's first digital computers, is turned on after a memory upgrade at Aberdeen Proving Ground, Maryland. It will remain in continuous operation until October 2, 1955.
- August 18 – Official start of construction of Automatic Computing Engine in the United Kingdom.
- September 9 – A moth lodged in a relay is found to be the cause of a malfunction in the Harvard Mark II electromechanical computer, logged as "First actual case of bug being found."
- October – First recorded use of the word computer in its modern sense, referring to an electronic digital machine.

== Mathematics ==
- John Crank and Phyllis Nicolson describe the Crank–Nicolson method in numerical analysis.
- George Dantzig publishes the simplex algorithm for linear programming.

== Medicine ==
- January – Prosopagnosia is first named by German neurologist Joachim Bodamer.
- August 20 – Doctors' Trial concludes, establishing the Nuremberg Code as a model of research ethics for human subject research.
- November 29 – Mary Barber publishes her classic paper on antibiotic resistance in Staphylococcus bacteria.
- The first antithyroid drug, propylthiouracil, is introduced in the United States.
- The first use of defibrillation on a human subject is performed by Claude Beck, professor of surgery at Case Western Reserve University.

== Metrology ==
- February 23 – The International Organization for Standardization (ISO) is founded.

== Paleontology ==
- April 18 – "Mrs. Ples" (STS 5), the most complete skull of an Australopithecus africanus specimen ever found in South Africa, is discovered at Sterkfontein (Transvaal) by Robert Broom and John T. Robinson.

== Physics ==
- June – The Doomsday Clock of the Bulletin of the Atomic Scientists is introduced.
- June 2 – The Shelter Island Conference on the Foundations of Quantum Mechanics convenes in New York State.
- August 15 – 'GLEEP' (the Graphite Low Energy Experimental Pile) experimental nuclear reactor runs for the first time at the Atomic Energy Research Establishment, Harwell, Oxfordshire, the first reactor to operate in Western Europe.
- December 20 – The discovery of kaon is published in Nature (journal).
- Harold Urey, Jacob Bigeleisen, and Maria Mayer introduce the Urey–Bigeleisen–Mayer equation, a model for approximating isotope fractionation.

== Technology ==
- February 21 – Edwin H. Land demonstrates the first practical instant camera, the Land Camera, in New York City. It will first be on commercial sale in December 1948.
- November 13 – First AK-47 selective-fire, gas-operated assault rifle produced in the Soviet Union by Mikhail Kalashnikov.
- November 17–December 23 – John Bardeen and Walter Brattain working under William Shockley at AT&T's Bell Labs in the United States demonstrate the transistor effect.
- December 11 – A hexagonal cellular telephone network is proposed by Douglas H. Ring and W. Rae Young of Bell Labs for mobile phones in vehicles.
- The clavioline is invented by Constant Martin.
- The disposable nappy is invented by Valerie Hunter Gordon.
- Raytheon produces the first commercial microwave oven.

== Awards ==
- Nobel Prizes
  - Physics – Edward Victor Appleton
  - Chemistry – Sir Robert Robinson
  - Medicine – Carl Ferdinand Cori, Gerty Cori, Bernardo Houssay

== Births ==
- January 24 – Michio Kaku, American theoretical physicist and popularizer of science.
- January 29 – Linda B. Buck, American biologist, recipient of the Nobel Prize in Physiology or Medicine, 2004.
- January 30 – Masaki Kashiwara, Japanese mathematician.
- February 4 – John Campbell Brown (died 2019), Scottish astronomer.
- March 16 – Keith Devlin, English-born mathematician and popularizer of science.
- April 18 – Chris Rapley, British climate scientist.
- May 9 – Michael Levitt, South African-born computational biologist, recipient of the Nobel Prize in Chemistry, 2013.
- June 8 – Eric F. Wieschaus, American biologist, recipient of the Nobel Prize in Physiology or Medicine, 1995.
- June 15 – Alain Aspect, French quantum physicist, recipient of the Nobel Prize in Physics
- June 25 – Will Steffen (died 2023), American-born Australian chemist.
- July 5 – Lalji Singh (died 2017), Indian biotechnologist and cytogeneticist, "father of Indian DNA fingerprinting".
- July 30 – Françoise Barré-Sinoussi, French virologist, recipient of the Nobel Prize in Physiology or Medicine, 2008.
- August 21 – Margaret Chan, Hong Kong-born physician.
- December 6 – Geoffrey Hinton, English-born cognitive psychologist and computer scientist, "godfather of AI", recipient of the Nobel Prize in Physics 2024.
- December 16 – Martyn Poliakoff, British chemist and popularizer of science.
- Stuart W. Jamieson, Rhodesian-born cardiothoracic surgeon.

== Deaths ==
- February 12 – Moses Gomberg (born 1866), American chemist.
- February 25 – Friedrich Paschen (born 1865), German physicist.
- August 23 – Roy Chadwick (born 1893), English aircraft designer (aircraft accident).
- September 15 – Annie Maunder (born 1868), Anglo-Irish astronomer.
- October 2 – P. D. Ouspensky (born 1878), Russian-born philosopher.
- October 4 – Max Planck (born 1858), German quantum physicist.
- November 17 – Emil Racoviță (born 1868), Romanian biologist, speleologist and polar explorer.
- December 1
  - John Fraser (born 1885), Scottish surgeon.
  - G. H. Hardy (born 1877), English mathematician.
- December 17 – J. N. Brønsted (born 1879), Danish physical chemist.
