= Thomas Lambert House =

Historic house in Massachusetts, United States

- U.S. National Register of Historic Places
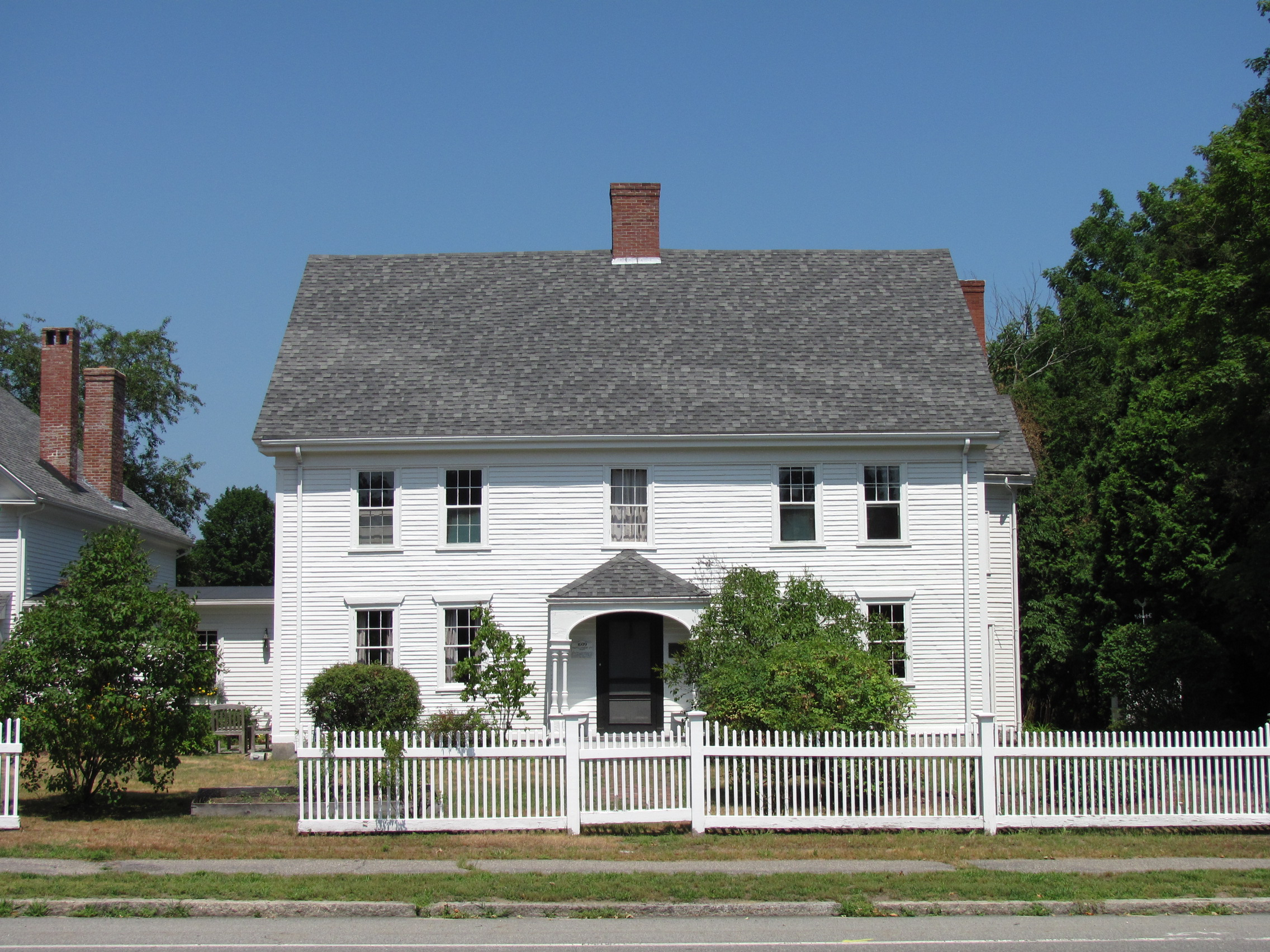
- Thomas Lambert House

- Location within Massachusetts Location within the United States
- Location: 142 Main Street, Rowley, Massachusetts
- Coordinates: 42°42′54″N 70°52′51″W
- Built: 1699
- Architectural style: Colonial
- MPS: First Period Buildings of Eastern Massachusetts TR
- NRHP reference No.: 90000256
- Added to NRHP: March 9, 1990

The Thomas Lambert House is a historic colonial First Period house in Rowley, Massachusetts, United States. It was listed on the National Register of Historic Places in 1990.

== See also ==
- List of the oldest buildings in Massachusetts
- National Register of Historic Places listings in Essex County, Massachusetts
