= 1712 in science =

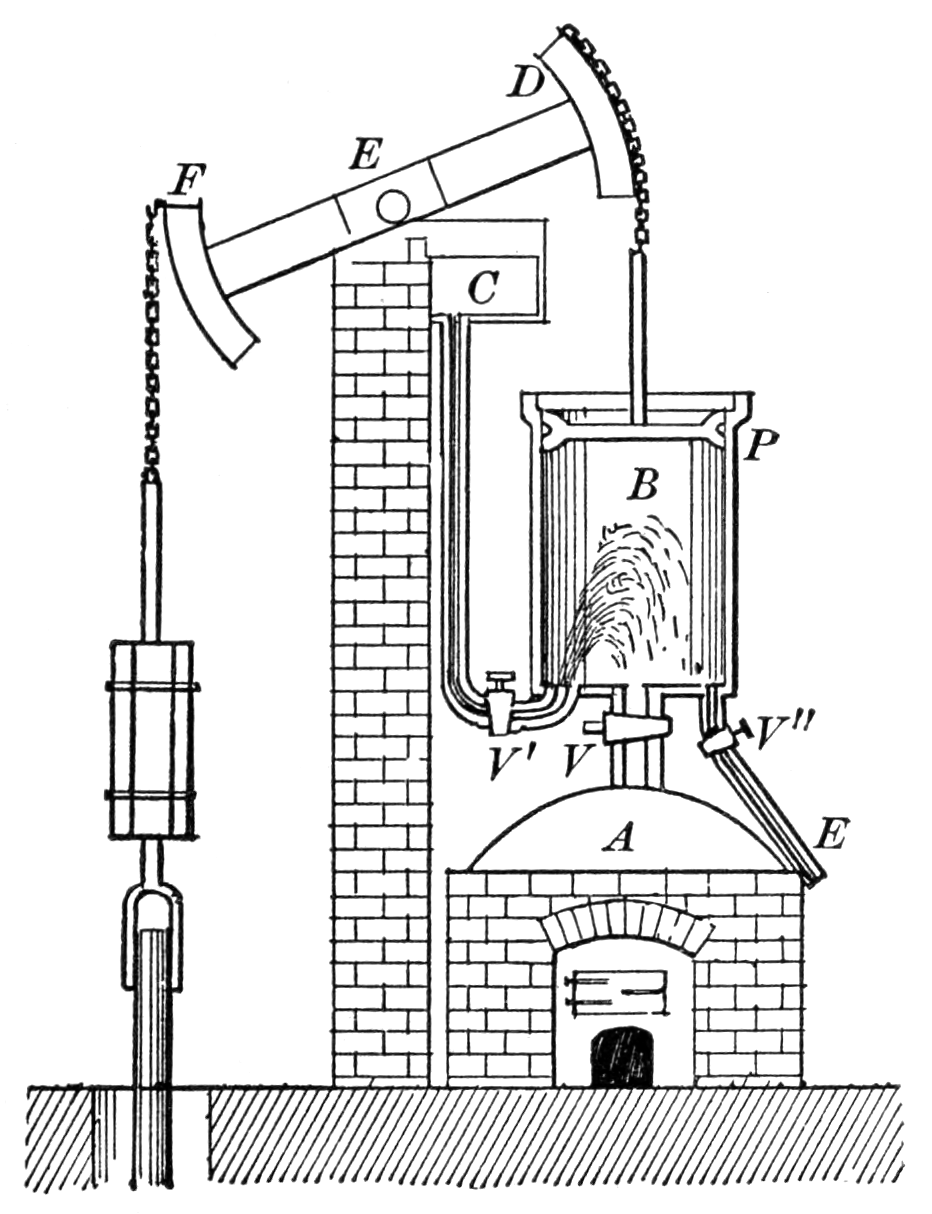
Diagram of a Newcomen steam engine

The year 1712 in science and technology involved some significant events.

== Astronomy ==
- John Flamsteed's Historia Coelestis is first published, against his will and without credit by Isaac Newton and Edmond Halley with the influence of John Arbuthnot. (A final version, approved by Flamsteed, is published posthumously in 1725.)

== Mathematics ==
- Seki Takakazu's discovery of what become known as Bernoulli numbers is first published in his posthumous Katsuyo Sanpō.
- Giacomo F. Maraldi experimentally obtains the angle in the rhombic dodecahedron shape, which becomes known as the Maraldi angle.

== Technology ==
- The first known working Newcomen steam engine is built by Thomas Newcomen with John Calley to pump water out of mines in the Black Country of England.

== Institutions ==
- January 16 – A military engineering school is established in Moscow which is to become the A.F. Mozhaysky Military-Space Academy.

== Births ==
- March 8 – John Fothergill, English physician (died 1780)
- March 27 – Claude Bourgelat, French veterinary surgeon (died 1779)
- June 15 – Andrew Gordon, Scottish-born Benedictine monk, physicist and inventor (died 1751)
- undated
  - Angélique du Coudray, French pioneer of modern midwifery (died 1789)
  - Bartholomew Mosse, Irish surgeon and impresario (died 1759)

== Deaths ==
- February 2 – Martin Lister, English naturalist (born 1639)
- March 25 – Nehemiah Grew, English naturalist (born 1641)
- August 29 – Gregory King, English statistician (born 1648)
- September 14 – Giovanni Cassini, Italian-born astronomer (born 1625)
