= 1766 in science =

The year 1766 in science and technology involved some significant events.

== Astronomy ==
- Lagrange submits a paper on the movements of Jupiter's satellites to the French Academy of Sciences.

== Biology ==
- April 9 – American botanist John Bartram completes his first exploration and cataloging of North American plants after more than nine months.
- Moses Harris publishes The Aurelian, or, Natural History of English Insects; Namely, Moths and Butterflies.
- English painter George Stubbs publishes The Anatomy of the Horse.

== Chemistry ==
- May 29 – Henry Cavendish presents to the Royal Society of London his paper "On Factitious Airs". This is generally credited as showing the discovery of hydrogen, since it describes the density of 'inflammable air', which forms water on combustion.
- Pierre Macquer publishes his Dictionnaire de chymie.

== Exploration ==
- November 15 – Louis Antoine de Bougainville leaves Nantes for a three-year circumnavigation of the world with the ships Boudeuse and Étoile; the botanist Philibert Commerçon is on board.

== Mathematics ==
- Arima Yoriyuki finds a rational approximation of $\pi$, correct to 29 digits.
- Euler gives up his post as director of mathematics at the Prussian Academy of Sciences and returns to Saint Petersburg. On the recommendation of Euler and d'Alembert, Lagrange succeeds him in Berlin, where he will stay for over twenty years.

== Medicine ==
- October – Addenbrooke's Hospital, Cambridge, England, completed.

== Metallurgy ==
- The Cranege brothers experiment with the use of the reverberatory furnace for the production of wrought iron from cast iron using coal fuel at the Coalbrookdale iron works under the sponsorship of Richard Reynolds in England.

== Events ==
- Joseph Wright of Derby paints A Philosopher Lecturing on the Orrery.

== Awards ==
- Copley Medal: William Brownrigg; Edward Delaval; Henry Cavendish

== Births ==
- July 6 – Alexander Wilson, Scottish-born ornithologist (died 1813)
- July 8 – Dominique Jean Larrey, French surgeon, pioneer of battlefield medicine (died 1842)
- August 3 – Kurt Sprengel, German botanist (died 1833)
- August 6 – William Hyde Wollaston, English chemist (died 1828)
- September 6 – John Dalton, English chemist and physicist (died 1844)
- September 24 – John Farey, Sr., English geologist (died 1826)
- December 23 – Wilhelm Hisinger, Swedish physicist and chemist (died 1852)
- December 26 – William Goforth, American physician and paleontologist (died 1817)
- December 29 – Charles Macintosh, Scottish inventor of a waterproof fabric (died 1843)
- John Templeton, "father of Irish botany" (died 1825)

== Deaths ==
- March 10 – Jane Colden, American botanist (born 1724)
- May 5 – Jean Astruc, French physician and scholar (born 1684)
- November 29 – John Wyatt, English inventor (born 1700)
