= 1843 in science =

The year 1843 in science and technology involved some significant events, listed below.

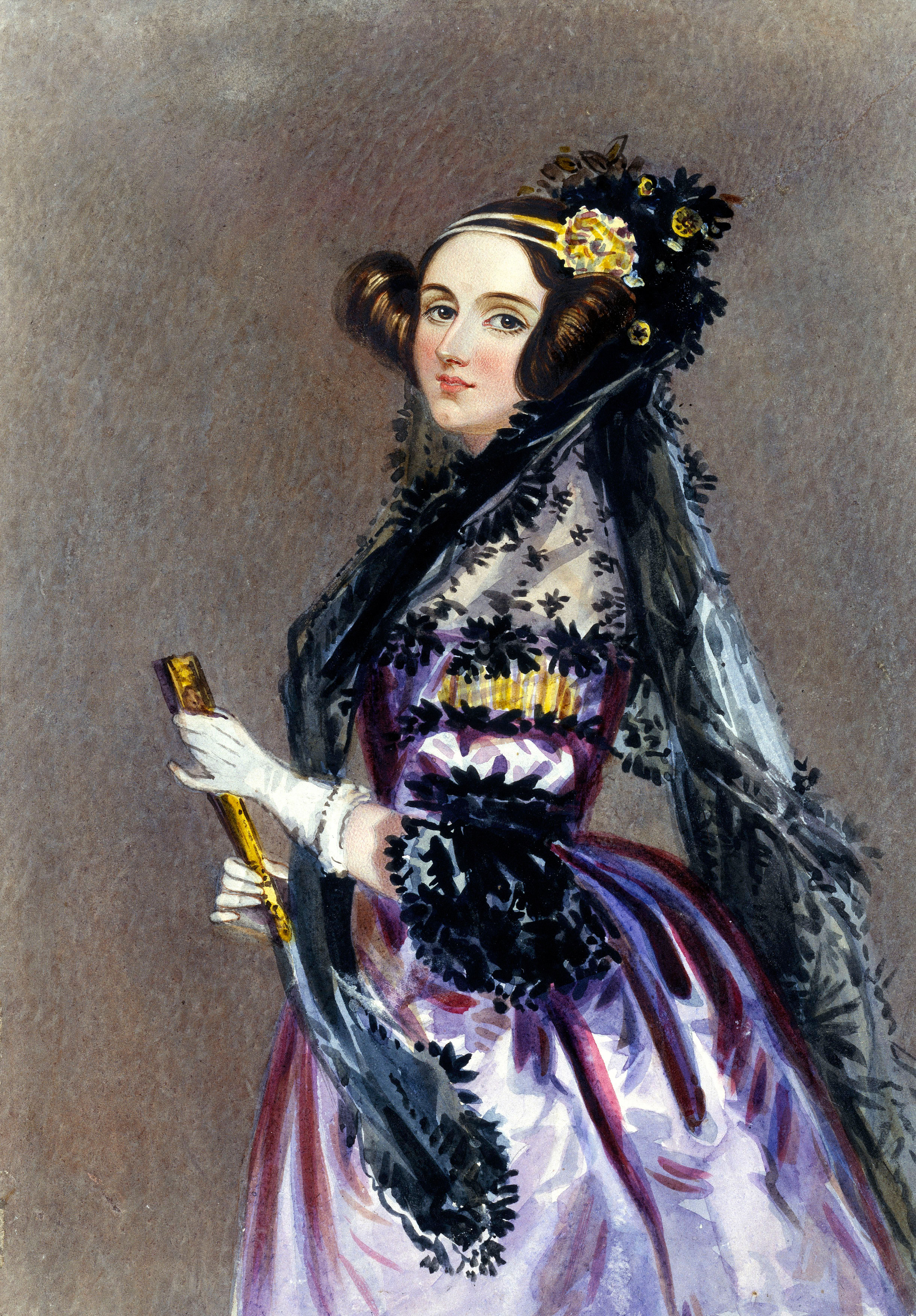
Ada Lovelace, computing pioneer

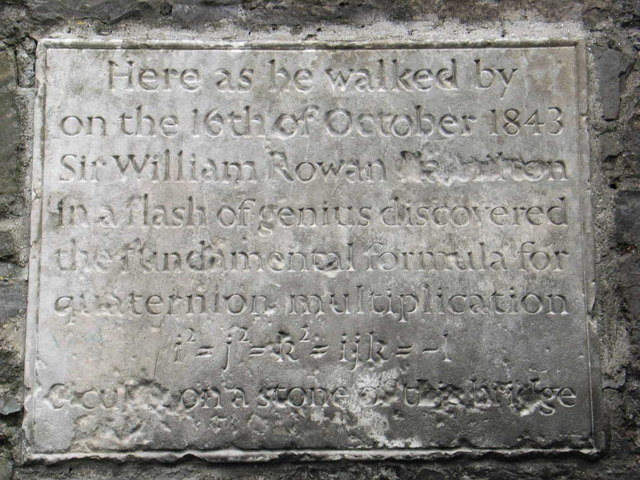
Plaque on Broom Bridge, Cabra, Dublin commemorating where William Rowan Hamilton inscribed his formula for quaternions

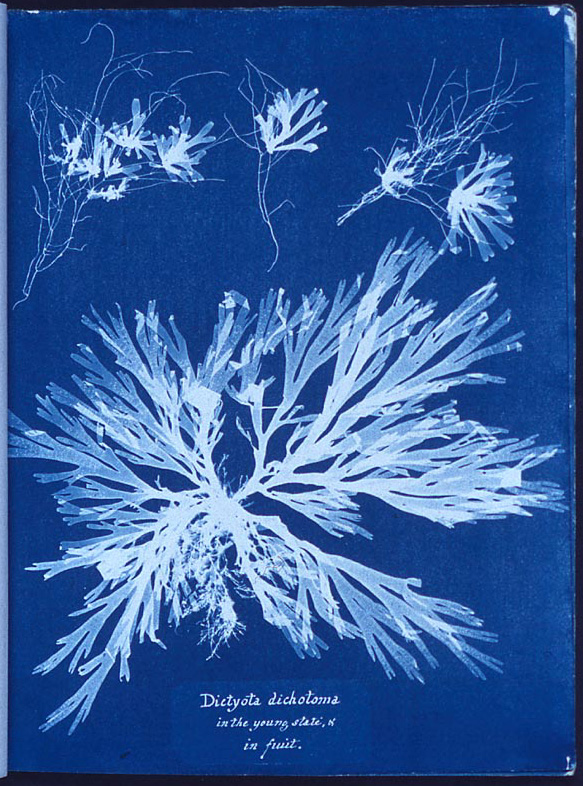
Cyanotype photogram by Anna Atkins

== Astronomy ==
- March 11–14 – Eta Carinae flares to become the second brightest star.
- February 5–April 19 – "Great March Comet" observed.
- December 21 – The first total solar eclipse of Saros 139 occurs over southern Asia.
- Heinrich Schwabe reports a periodic change in the number of sunspots: they wax and wane in number according to a ten-year cycle.

== Chemistry ==
- Jean-Baptiste Dumas names lactose.
- Carl Mosander discovers the chemical elements Terbium and Erbium.
- John J. Waterston produces an account of the kinetic theory of gases.
- Alfred Bird produces single-acting baking powder.

== Mathematics ==
- September – Ada Lovelace translates and expands Menabrea’s notes on Charles Babbage's analytical engine, including an algorithm for calculating a sequence of Bernoulli numbers, regarded as the world's first computer program.
- October 16 – William Rowan Hamilton discovers the calculus of quaternions and deduces that they are non-commutative.
- Arthur Cayley and James Joseph Sylvester found the algebraic invariant theory.
- John T. Graves discovers the octonions.
- Pierre-Alphonse Laurent discovers and presents the Laurent expansion theorem.

== Physics ==
- James Prescott Joule experimentally finds the mechanical equivalent of heat.
- Ohm's acoustic law is proposed by German physicist Georg Ohm.

== Physiology and medicine ==
- April–May – English surgeon Benjamin Brodie extracts a coin lodged in the bronchus of engineer Isambard Kingdom Brunel using novel methods.
- British surgeon James Braid publishes Neurypnology: or the Rationale of Nervous Sleep, a key text in the history of hypnotism.
- Oliver Wendell Holmes Sr., argues that puerperal fever is spread by lack of hygiene in physicians.

== Technology ==
- March 25 – Completion of the Thames Tunnel, the first bored underwater tunnel in the world (engineer: Marc Isambard Brunel).
- July 19 – Launch of SS Great Britain, the first iron-hulled, propeller-driven ship to cross the Atlantic Ocean (designer: Isambard Kingdom Brunel).
- November 21 – Thomas Hancock patents the vulcanisation of rubber using sulphur in the United Kingdom
- The steam powered rotary printing press is invented by Richard March Hoe in the United States.
- Robert Stirling and his brother James convert a steam engine at a Dundee factory to operate as a Stirling engine.
- The first public telegraph line in the United Kingdom is laid between Paddington and Slough.
- Approximate date – Euphonium invented.

== Publications ==
- October – Anna Atkins begins publication of Photographs of British Algae: Cyanotype Impressions, a collection of contact printed cyanotype photograms of algae which forms the first book illustrated with photographic images.

== Awards ==
- Copley Medal: Jean-Baptiste Dumas
- Wollaston Medal for Geology: Jean-Baptiste Elie de Beaumont; Pierre Armand Dufrenoy

== Births ==
- January 13 – David Ferrier (died 1928), Scottish neurologist.
- May 6 – G. K. Gilbert (died 1918), American geologist.
- June 12 – David Gill (died 1914), Scottish astronomer.
- June 23 – Paul Heinrich von Groth (died 1927), German mineralogist.
- July 24 – William de Wiveleslie Abney (died 1920), English astronomer.
- August 17 – Alexandre Lacassagne (died 1924), French forensic scientist.
- November 30 – Martha Ripley (died 1912), American physician.
- December 11 – Robert Koch (died 1910), German physician, famous for the discovery of the tubercle bacillus (1882) and the cholera bacillus (1883) and for his development of Koch's postulates; awarded the Nobel Prize in Physiology or Medicine in 1905
- Adelaida Lukanina (died 1908), Russian chemist.

== Deaths ==
- July 25 – Charles Macintosh (born 1766), Scottish inventor of a waterproof fabric.
- August 10 – Robert Adrain (born 1775), Irish American mathematician.
- September 11 – Joseph Nicollet (born 1786), French geographer, explorer, mathematician and astronomer.
- September 19 – Gaspard-Gustave Coriolis (born 1792), French mathematician and discoverer of the Coriolis effect.
- September 30 – Richard Harlan (born 1796), American zoologist.
- November 16 – Abraham Colles (born 1773), Anglo-Irish surgeon.
