= 1795 in science =

The year 1795 in science and technology involved some significant events.

== Astronomy ==
- December 13 – A meteorite falls to Earth at Wold Newton, East Riding of Yorkshire, England, the first to be recognised in modern times.

== Botany ==
- National Botanic Gardens (Ireland) opened by the Royal Dublin Society.

== Mathematics ==
- The 18-year-old Carl Friedrich Gauss develops the basis for the method of least squares analysis.

== Medicine ==
- The British Royal Navy makes the use of lemon juice mandatory to prevent scurvy, largely due to the influence of Gilbert Blane.

== Metrology ==
- April 7 – The gram is decreed in France to be equal to "the absolute weight of a volume of water equal to the cube of the hundredth part of the metre, at the temperature of melting ice."

== Paleontology ==
- Georges Cuvier identifies the fossilised bones of a huge animal found in the Netherlands in 1770 as belonging to an extinct reptile.

== Technology ==
- August 24 – Rev. Samuel Henshall is granted an English patent for a corkscrew.
- November 30 – Joseph Bramah is granted an English patent for hydraulic machinery, notably the hydraulic press.

== Zoology ==
- Johann Matthäus Bechstein publishes his treatise on songbirds Naturgeschichte der Stubenvögel ("Natural History of Cage Birds") in Gotha.
- Étienne Geoffroy Saint-Hilaire publishes "Histoire des Makis, ou singes de Madagascar", introducing his theory of the unity of organic composition.

== Publications ==
- Leonhard Euler's Letters to a German Princess, On Different Subjects in Physics and Philosophy are first translated into English by Scottish minister Henry Hunter, targeted at women, whom Hunter felt Euler intended to educate.

== Awards ==
- Copley Medal: Jesse Ramsden

== Births ==
- January 6 – Anselme Payen, French chemist (died 1878)
- May 5 – Pierre Louis Alphée Cazenave, French dermatologist (died 1877)
- June 24 – Ernst Heinrich Weber, German physician, psychologist (died 1878)
- June 30 – Joseph Bienaimé Caventou, French chemist (died 1877)
- July 5 – Georg Ernst Ludwig Hampe, German pharmacist, botanist and bryologist (died 1880)
- July 10 – Jean-Baptiste Guimet, French industrial chemist (died 1871)
- November 12 – Thaddeus William Harris, American naturalist (died 1856)
- December 8 – Peter Andreas Hansen, Danish astronomer (died 1874)
- December 21
  - Francisco Javier Muñiz, Argentine physician and paleontologist (died 1871)
  - Jack Russell, English dog breeder (died 1883)

== Deaths ==
- January 21 – Samuel Wallis, English navigator (born 1728)
- March 21 – Giovanni Arduino, Italian geologist (born 1714)
- May 6 – Pieter Boddaert, Dutch physician and naturalist (born 1730)
- June 1 – Pierre-Joseph Desault, French anatomist and surgeon (born 1744)
- June 9 – François Chopart, French surgeon (born 1743)
- June 17 – Gilbert Romme, French politician and mathematician (born 1750)
- June 18 – Marie Marguerite Bihéron, French anatomist (born 1719)
- June 24 – William Smellie, Scottish naturalist and encyclopedist (born 1740)
- July 3 – Antonio de Ulloa, Spanish explorer (born 1716)
- August 14 – George Adams, English scientific instrument maker (born 1750)
- October 1 – Robert Bakewell, English agriculturalist and geneticist (born 1725)
- December 28 – Eugenio Espejo, Ecuadorian medical hygienist, lawyer and journalist (born 1747)
