= 1878 in science =

The year 1878 in science and technology involved many significant events, listed below.

== Astronomy ==
- English astronomer Richard A. Proctor describes the Zone of Avoidance, the area of the night sky that is obscured by our own galaxy, for the first time.

== Biology ==
- Death of last confirmed Cape Lion.

== Chemistry ==
- The rare earth element holmium is identified in erbium by Marc Delafontaine and Jacques-Louis Soret in Geneva and by Per Teodor Cleve in Sweden.

== Conservation ==
- An Act of Parliament in the United Kingdom places Epping Forest in the care of the City of London Corporation to remain unenclosed.

== Exploration ==
- June 22 – Adolf Erik Nordenskiöld sets out on the year-long first navigation of the Northern Sea Route, the shipping lane from the Atlantic Ocean to the Pacific Ocean along the Siberian coast.

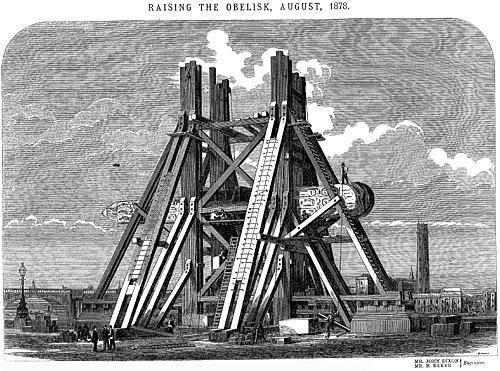
August – Cleopatra's Needle (horizontal) being raised in London.

== Geology ==
- Clarence King publishes Systematic Geology.
- Charles Lapworth publishes his analysis of the change in graptolite fossils through sequences of exposed shales in southern Scotland, establishing the importance of using graptolites to understand stratigraphic sequences.

== Mathematics ==
- Belgian mathematician Victor D'Hondt describes the D'Hondt method of voting.
- English mathematician Rev. William Allen Whitworth is the first to publish Bertrand's ballot theorem.

== Medicine ==
- Cesare Lombroso publishes L'uomo delinquente, setting out his theory of criminal atavism.
- Ádám Politzer publishes Lehrbuch der Ohrenheilkunde, a major otology textbook.
- Dentists Act in the United Kingdom limits the title of "dentist" and "dental surgeon" to qualified and registered practitioners.

== Meteorology ==
- February 11 – The first weekly weather report is published in the United Kingdom.

== Paleontology ==
- 31 Iguanodon skeletons are discovered in a coal mine at Bernissart, Belgium.
- The sauropod genus Diplodocus is first named by Othniel Charles Marsh as well as the Theropod genus Allosaurus. These are both from the Jurassic aged Morrison formation.

== Physics ==
- January 18 – Romanian mathematician Spiru Haret defends his doctoral thesis, which proves a result fundamental to the n-body problem in celestial mechanics.

== Technology ==
- February 19 – The phonograph is patented by Thomas Edison. The oldest known audio recording is recovered from this device in 2012.
- March – The 'basic' process, enabling the use of phosphoric iron ore in steelmaking, developed at Blaenavon Ironworks by Percy Gilchrist and Sidney Gilchrist Thomas, is first made public.
- May 22 – John Philip Holland's experimental powered submarine Holland I is launched in Paterson, New Jersey.
- June 15 – Eadweard Muybridge produces the sequence of stop-motion still photographs Sallie Gardner at a Gallop in California, a predecessor of silent film (capable of being viewed as an animation on a zoopraxiscope) demonstrating that all four feet of a galloping horse are off the ground at the same time.
- August – Cleopatra's Needle is raised onto its base in London.
- October 14 – The world's first recorded floodlit football fixture is played at Bramall Lane in Sheffield.
- December 18 – Joseph Swan of Newcastle upon Tyne in England announces his invention of an incandescent light bulb.
- December 31 – Karl Benz produces a two-stroke gas engine.
- William Crookes invents the Crookes tube which produces cathode rays.
- Osbourn Dorsey obtains a patent in the United States for a "door-holding device".
- Gustav Kessel obtains a patent in Germany for an espresso machine.
- Czech painter Karel Klíč perfects the photogravure process.
- Lester Allan Pelton produces the first operational Pelton wheel.
- Remington, in the United States, introduce their No. 2 typewriter, the first with a shift key enabling production of lower as well as upper case characters.

== Institutions ==
- October 1 – Virginia Polytechnic Institute and State University opens as Virginia Agricultural and Mechanical College in the United States.

== Awards ==
- Copley Medal: Jean Baptiste Boussingault
- Wollaston Medal for Geology: Thomas Wright

== Births ==
- January 1 – A. K. Erlang, Danish mathematician (died 1929)
- January 7 – Samuel James Cameron, Scottish obstetrician (died 1959)
- January 25 – Ernst Alexanderson, Swedish-born television pioneer (died 1975)
- February 5 – André Citroën, French automobile manufacturer (died 1935)
- February 8 – Martin Buber, Austrian philosopher (died 1965)
- February 10 – Jennie Smillie, Canadian gynecological surgeon (died 1981)
- February 28 – Pierre Fatou, French mathematician (died 1929)
- March 4 – Peter D. Ouspensky, Russian philosopher (died 1947)
- April 11 – Percy Lane Oliver, British pioneer of voluntary blood donation (died 1944)
- April 16 – Owen Thomas Jones, Welsh geologist (died 1967)
- June 3 – Barney Oldfield, American automobile racer and pioneer (died 1946)
- June 12 – James Oliver Curwood, American novelist and conservationist (died 1927)
- July 12 – Peeter Põld, Estonian politician and pedagogical scientist (died 1930)
- August 28 – George Whipple, American winner of the Nobel Prize in Physiology or Medicine (died 1976)
- September 5 – Robert von Lieben, Austrian physicist (died 1913)
- September 13 – Matilde Moisant, American pilot (died 1964)
- October 1 – Helen Mayo, Australian pediatrician (died 1967)
- November 7 – Lise Meitner, Austrian-Swedish physicist (died 1968)
- November 8 – Dorothea Bate, Welsh-born paleozoologist (died 1951)
- December 25 – Louis Chevrolet, Swiss-born race driver and automobile builder (died 1941)
- December 25 – Joseph Schenck, Russian-born film executive (died 1962)

== Deaths ==
- January 18 – William Stokes, Irish physician (born 1804)
- January 18 – Antoine César Becquerel, French scientist (born 1788)
- January 19 – Henri Victor Regnault, French physical chemist (born 1810)
- February 8 – Elias Magnus Fries, Swedish botanist (born 1794)
- February 10 – Claude Bernard, French physiologist (born 1813)
- February 26 – Angelo Secchi, Italian astronomer (born 1818)
- March 16 – William Banting, English undertaker and dietician (b. c.1796)
- May 13 – Joseph Henry, American physicist (born 1797)
- June 6 – Robert Stirling, Scottish clergyman and inventor (born 1790)
- July 23 – Baron Carl von Rokitansky, Bohemian pathologist (born 1804)
- September 25 – August Heinrich Petermann, German cartographer (born 1822)
- Friedrich Freese, German botanist (born 1794)
