= 1714 in science =

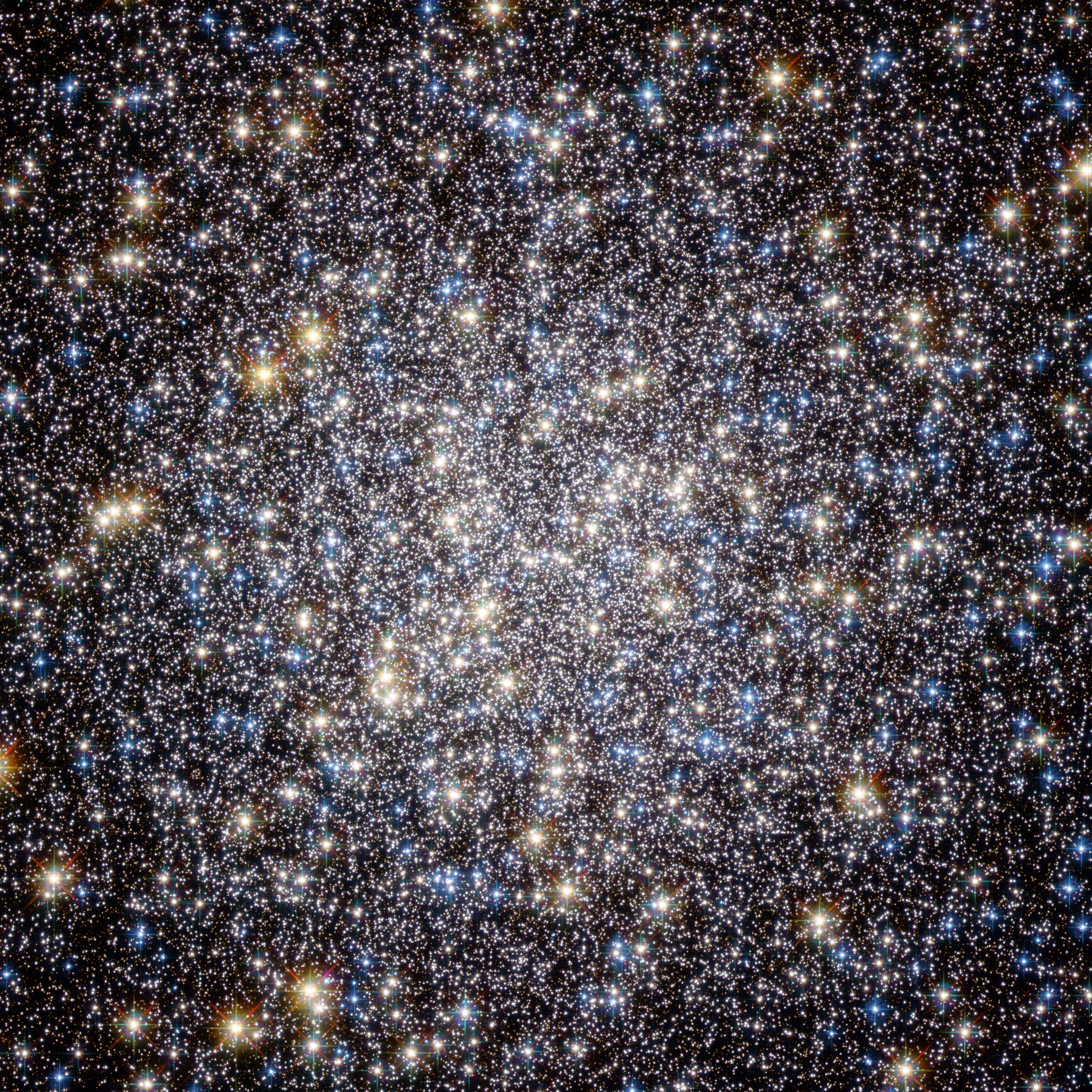
Messier 13, a great globular cluster, was discovered by the British astronomer Edmund Halley in 1714. It is located in the constellation of Hercules and is one of the brightest and best-known clusters in the sky.

The year 1714 in science and technology involved some significant events.

== Botany ==
- August 17 – Fragaria chiloensis, the Chilean strawberry, is brought to Europe by French military engineer Amédée-François Frézier.

== Mathematics ==
- March – Roger Cotes publishes Logometrica in the Philosophical Transactions of the Royal Society. He provides the first proof of what becomes known as Euler's formula and constructs the logarithmic spiral.
- May – Brook Taylor publishes a paper, written in 1708, in the Philosophical Transactions of the Royal Society which describes his solution to the center of oscillation problem.
- Gottfried Leibniz discusses the harmonic triangle.

== Medicine ==
- April 14 – Anne, Queen of Great Britain, performs the last touching for the "King's evil".
- Dominique Anel uses the first fine-pointed syringe in surgery, later known as "Anel's syringe".
- Herman Boerhaave introduces a modern system of clinical teaching at the University of Leiden.
- The anatomical engravings of Bartolomeo Eustachi (died 1574) are published for the first time as Tabulae anatomicae by Giovanni Maria Lancisi.

== Technology ==
- Henry Mill obtains a British patent for a machine resembling a typewriter.

== Events ==
- July – The Parliament of Great Britain offers the Longitude prize to anyone who can solve the problem of accurately determining a ship's longitude.

== Births ==
- January 21 – Anna Morandi, Bolognese anatomist (died 1774)
- January 6 – Percivall Pott, English surgeon (died 1788)
- June 17 – César-François Cassini de Thury, French astronomer (died 1784)
- September 6 – Robert Whytt, Scottish physician (died 1766)
- October 16 – Giovanni Arduino, Italian geologist (died 1795)
- October 25 – James Burnett, Lord Monboddo, Scottish philosopher and evolutionary thinker (died 1799)
- December 19 – John Winthrop, American astronomer (died 1779)
- December 31 – Arima Yoriyuki, Japanese mathematician (died 1783)
- Alexander Wilson, Scottish surgeon, type founder, astronomer, meteorologist and mathematician (died 1786)

== Deaths ==
- October 5 – Kaibara Ekiken, Japanese philosopher and botanist (born 1630)
- November 1 – John Radcliffe, English physician and benefactor (born 1650)
- November 5 – Bernardino Ramazzini, Italian physician (born 1633)
