= 1733 in architecture =

The year 1733 in architecture involved some significant events.

== Buildings and structures ==
=== Buildings ===
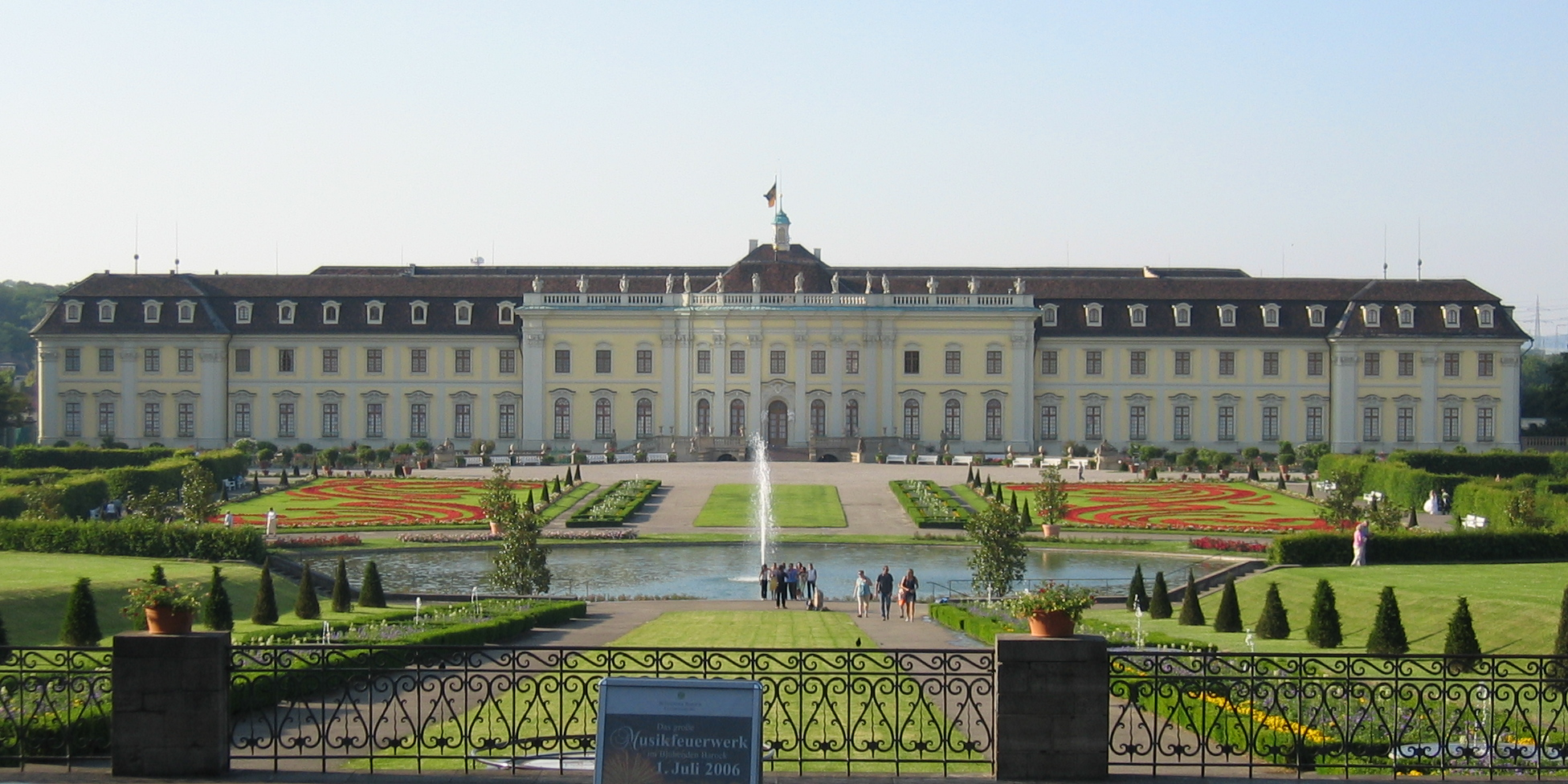
Ludwigsburg Palace, Germany

- Clandon Park (Surrey), designed by Giacomo Leoni, completed.
- Trafalgar House (Wiltshire) completed.
- St John Horsleydown and St Luke Old Street in London, both designed by Nicholas Hawksmoor and John James, are completed for the Commission for Building Fifty New Churches.
- Wade's Bridge, Aberfeldy, Scotland, designed by William Adam, built.
- Ludwigsburg Palace is completed.

== Births ==
- January 4 – Robert Mylne, Scottish architect (died 1811)

== Deaths ==
- December 7 – Edward Lovett Pearce, Irish palladian architect (born 1699)
