= Victor Despeignes =

French physician (1866–1937)

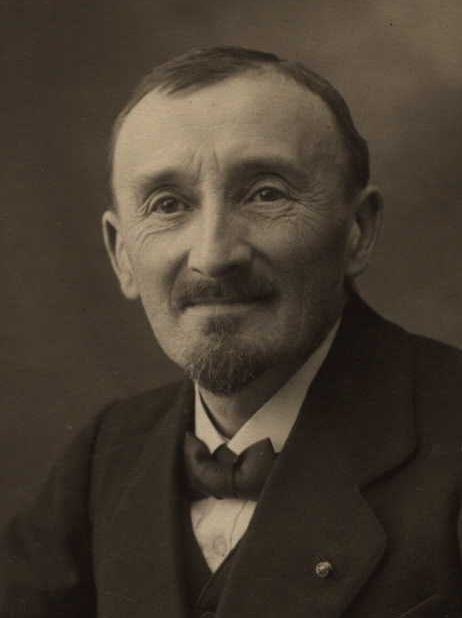
- Born: 14 February 1866; Lyon, France
- Died: 30 July 1937 (aged 71)
- Known for: First to use radiation therapy to treat cancer

Victor Despeignes (14 February 1866 – 30 July 1937) was a French physician. He was a pioneer in radiation oncology and possibly was the first person to use X-rays to treat cancer, which he did in July 1896 for a patient with stomach cancer. He was also the first physician to publish a paper on radiation therapy, in 1896, dealing with that case. This attempt was less than a year after the publication of the discovery of X-rays by Wilhelm Röntgen.

== Personal life ==
François Victor Despeignes was born in Lyon on 14 February 1866.

He died on 30 July 1937. He was buried at the cemetery in a small village in the Drôme Provençale called Vinsobres.

== Cancer treatment ==
Researchers had already discovered that X-rays could kill bacteria by 1896. The predominant theory at the time was that cancer was some kind of parasitic infection. Louis Charles Émile Lortet and Philibert Jean Victor Genoud tried to kill tuberculosis in infected guinea pigs using X-rays from March to June 1896 in the same city of Lyon.

A 52-year-old man with an epigastric tumor presented to Despeignes. The tumor was about the size of the head of an eight-month-old fetus. Despeignes believed that cancer was caused by parasites, and that perhaps he could kill the parasite with radiation. On 4 July 1896 he commenced the X-ray treatments. Two half-hour treatments were given each day. Other treatments given to the patient were opium for pain relief, morphine and chloroform. A diet of condurango and milk was prescribed, with injections of artificial serum. The patient experienced pain relief, but died on 24 July. The cancer had shrunk by about 50%. Despeignes' equipment consisted of a Crookes' tube and six Radiguet battery elements.

Inspired by this, other physicians tried using X-rays to treat numerous human ailments from acne to breast cancer. Malignancies were found to be the most amenable to X-ray treatment. They also found out the side effects.

== Other work ==
Between 1866 and 1894, Despeignes worked as a hygienist physician in Lyon. He researched the quality of tap water and tuberculosis. He became the chief of the laboratory of Louis Pasteur in 1892. Between 1907 and 1937 he was the director of town hygiene in Chambéry.

== Works ==
- "Nouveau régulateur pour étuve chauffée au pétrole" (New regulator for oven heated oil) Association Typographique, 1890
- "A propos de la question des eaux de Lyon" (Concerning Lyon's waters) Association Typographique, Lyon, 1891
- Despeignes, Victor (1891). Étude expérimentale sur les microbes des eaux, avec applications a l'hygiène sanitaire de la ville de Lyon. Paris: J.-B. Baillière.
- "Deux cas de kyste hydatique" (Τwo cases of hydatid cysts) 1903 with Ph. Genoud
