= 1871 in science =

The year 1871 in science and technology involved some significant events, listed below.

== Astronomy and space sciences ==
- October 5 – The Società degli Spettroscopisti Italiani (laterSocietà Astronomica Italiana) is established in Rome, the first scientific organisation in the world dedicated to astrophysics.

== Exploration ==
- May 19–September 27 – Benjamin Leigh Smith's 1871 expedition to Svalbard.
- June 8–October 2 – Hayden Geological Survey of 1871 in the United States, including what will next year become the Yellowstone National Park. Between July 21–August 26, the first ever photographs of this region are taken by William Henry Jackson.

== Physics ==
- November 17 – George Biddell Airy presents his discovery that astronomical aberration is independent of the local medium.
- James Clerk Maxwell makes public the thought experiment which will become known as Maxwell's demon in the philosophy of thermal and statistical physics, in his book Theory of Heat and establishes Maxwell relations, statements of equality among the second derivatives of the thermodynamic potentials with respect to different thermodynamic variables.
- John Strutt publishes his first papers on the theory of acoustic resonance and on the phenomenon now called Rayleigh scattering, explaining why the sky is blue.

== Physiology and medicine ==
- Porphyria is first explained biochemically by Felix Hoppe-Seyler.
- Friedrich Trendelenburg describes the first successful elective human tracheotomy to be performed for the purpose of administering general anaesthesia.
- Friedrich Miescher publishes his 1869 isolation of what will subsequently be called nucleic acid.

== Technology ==
- Institution of Electrical Engineers established in the United Kingdom as the Society of Telegraph Engineers.
- Souter Lighthouse in England is the first to use alternating current electricity.
- Ralph Hart Tweddell invents the portable hydraulic riveter, manufactured by Fielding & Platt of Gloucester in England.
- The "Hoe web perfecting press", an improved rotary printing press invented by Richard March Hoe, is first used to print the New-York Tribune.
- Montague Redgrave is granted U.S. Patent #115,357 for his Improvements in Bagatelle, the basis of the spring-loaded plunger used in pinball machines.

== Publications ==
- Cosmos: A Sketch of a Physical Description of the Universe by Alexander von Humboldt, covering a large number of topics in scientific exploration and invention.
- The Descent of Man and Selection in Relation to Sex by Charles Darwin, outlining his theory for man's origins and his theory of sexual selection, and including his first published use of the term evolution (published by John Murray in London, February 24).
- A History of the Birds of Europe by Henry Eeles Dresser (publication begins).

== Awards ==
- Copley Medal: Julius Robert von Mayer
- Wollaston Medal for Geology: Andrew Ramsay

== Births ==
- January 7 – Émile Borel (died 1956), French mathematician.
- February 15 – Martin Knudsen (died 1949), Danish physicist.
- May 19
  - Walter Russell (died 1963), American polymath.
  - Inez Whipple Wilder (died 1929), American herpetologist and anatomist.
- August 15 – Arthur Tansley (died 1955), English botanist and ecologist.
- August 19 – Orville Wright (died 1948), American pioneer aviator.
- August 30 – Ernest Rutherford (died 1937), New Zealand-born British physicist and laureate of the Nobel Prize in Physics.
- September 17 – Eivind Astrup (died 1895), Norwegian Arctic explorer.
- October 19 – Walter Bradford Cannon (died 1945), American physiologist.
- October 26 – Albert Stewart Meek (died 1943), English-born ornithologist.

== Deaths ==
- January 25 – Jeanne Villepreux-Power (born 1794), French marine biologist.
- March 18 – Augustus De Morgan (born 1806), British logician.
- April 8 – Francisco Javier Muñiz (born 1795), Argentine physician and paleontologist.
- April 16 – Johann Ritter von Oppolzer (born 1808), Austrian physician.
- June 9 – Anna Atkins (b. 1799), British botanist.
- May 11 – John Herschel (born 1792), English mathematician and astronomer.
- October 18 – Charles Babbage (born 1791), English mathematician and inventor of computing machines.
- December 8 – James Murray (born 1788), Irish physician.
