= 1725 in architecture =

The year 1725 in architecture involved some significant events.

== Buildings and structures ==
=== Buildings ===
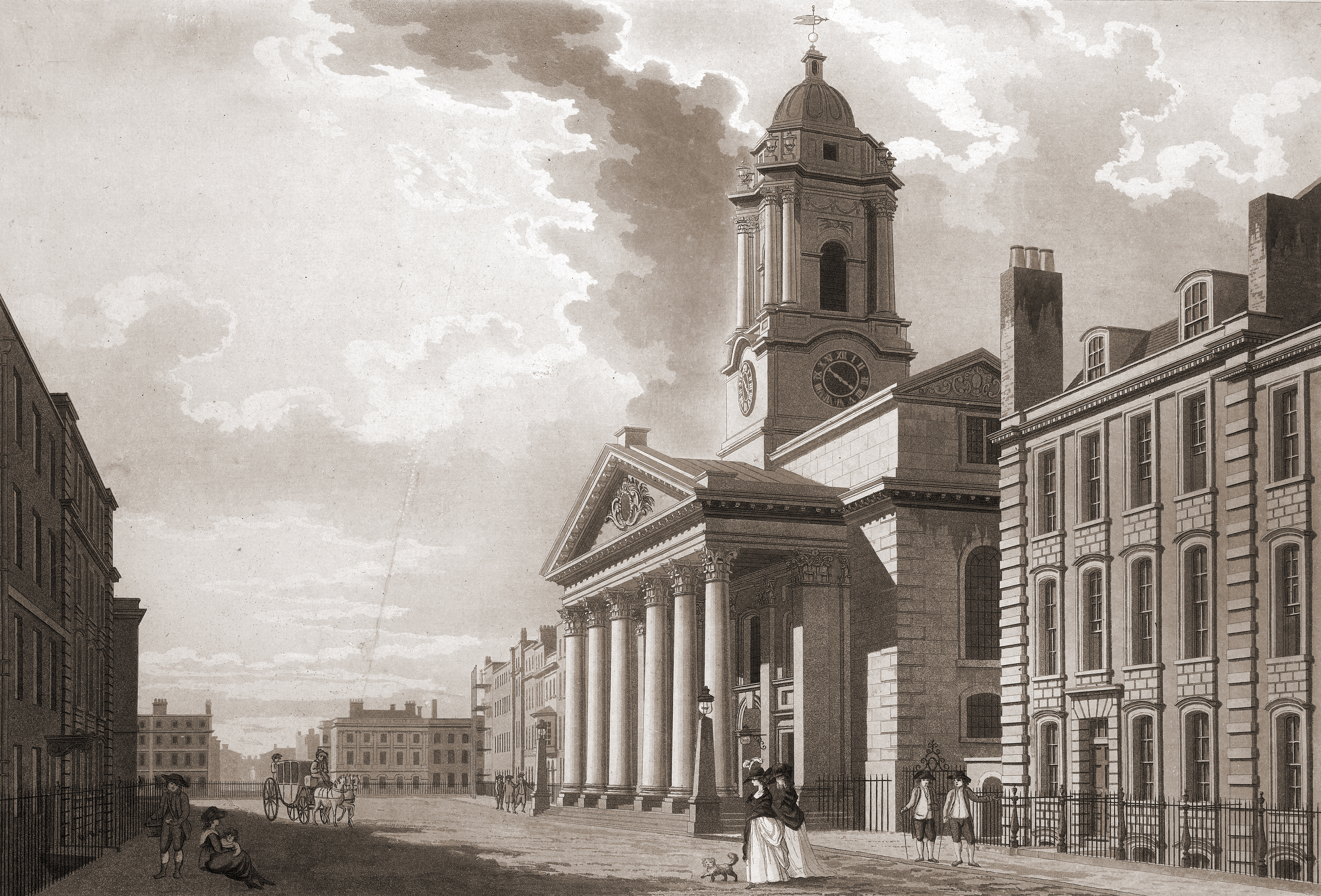
St George's, Hanover Square, London

- Peterhof Palace near Saint Petersburg is completed.
- St George's, Hanover Square, London, designed by John James, is completed for the Commission for Building Fifty New Churches.
- Hôpital civil, Strasbourg, completed

== Births ==
- Matthew Brettingham the Younger, English architect (died 1803)
- François Dominique Barreau de Chefdeville, French architect (died 1765)
- Approximate date – James Bridges, English architect working in Bristol

== Deaths ==
- March 2 – José Benito de Churriguera, Spanish architect and sculptor (born 1665)
