= 1711 in science =

The year 1711 in science and technology involved some significant events.

== Biology ==
- Luigi Ferdinando Marsigli shows that coral is an animal rather than a plant as previously thought.

== Mathematics ==
- Giovanni Ceva publishes De re numeraria quod fieri potuit, geometrice tractata (On the matter of money, what could be done, treated geometrically), one of the first works in mathematical economics; in it Ceva attempted to solve the conditions of equilibrium for the monetary system of a state like Mantua.
- John Keill, writing in the journal of the Royal Society and with Isaac Newton's presumed blessing, accuses Gottfried Leibniz of having plagiarized Newton's calculus, formally starting the Leibniz and Newton calculus controversy.

== Technology ==
- John Shore invents the tuning fork

== Births ==
- May 18 – Ruđer Bošković, Ragusan polymath (died 1787)
- July 22 – Georg Wilhelm Richmann, Russian physicist (died 1753)
- September 22 – Thomas Wright, English astronomer, mathematician, instrument maker, architect, garden designer, antiquary and genealogist (died 1786)
- October 31 – Laura Bassi, Italian scientist (died 1778)
- November 19 – Mikhail Lomonosov, Russian scientist (died 1765)
