= 1786 in science =

The year 1786 in science and technology involved some significant events.

== Astronomy ==
- January 17 – Pierre Méchain first observes Comet Encke, from Paris.
- August 1 – Caroline Herschel becomes the first woman to discover a comet, observing from England.

== Biology ==
- Subfossil bones of the Rodrigues solitaire are discovered.

== Exploration ==
- Summer – English captain George Dixon begins a year-long exploration of the shores of modern-day British Columbia and southeastern Alaska. He spends the intervening winter in the Hawaiian Islands, where he becomes the first European to visit the island of Molokaʻi.

== Linguistics ==
- February 2 – In a speech before The Asiatic Society in Calcutta, Sir William Jones notes the formal resemblances between Latin, Greek, and Sanskrit, laying the foundation for comparative linguistics and Indo-European studies.

== Mathematics ==
- Erland Samuel Bring publishes Meletemata quaedam mathematica circa transformationem aequationum algebraicarum, proposing algebraic solutions to quintic functions.
- Joseph Louis Lagrange moves from Prussia to Paris under the patronage of King Louis XVI.
- William Playfair produces the first line and bar charts.

== Technology ==
- August – James Rumsey tests his first steamboat in the Potomac River at Shepherdstown, Virginia.
- Ignaz von Born introduces a method of extracting metals using the patio process in his Ueber des Anquicken der gold- und silberhältigen Erze, published in Vienna.
- Scottish millwright Andrew Meikle invents a practical threshing machine.

== Awards ==
- Copley Medal: Not awarded

== Births ==
- January 5 – Thomas Nuttall, English naturalist (died 1859)
- February 26 – François Arago, French mathematician, physicist and astronomer (died 1853)
- February 28 – Christian Ramsay, Scottish botanist (died 1839)
- April 16 – Thomas Sewall, American anatomist (died 1845)
- April 28 – Elizabeth Andrew Warren, Cornish botanist and marine algolologist (died 1864)
- July 24 – Joseph Nicollet, French geographer, explorer, mathematician and astronomer (died 1843)
- November 3 – Ernst Friedrich Germar, German entomologist (died 1853)
- December 6 – Johann Georg Bodmer, Swiss mechanical engineer and inventor (died 1864)

== Deaths ==
- February 25 – Thomas Wright, English astronomer, mathematician, instrument maker, architect, garden designer, antiquary and genealogist (born 1711)
- May 2 – Petronella Johanna de Timmerman, Dutch scientist (born 1723)
- May 4 – Leonardo Ximenes, Tuscan polymath (born 1716)
- May 15 – Eva Ekeblad, agronomist, first woman in the Swedish Royal Academy of Science (born 1724)
- May 21 – Carl Wilhelm Scheele, Swedish chemist (born 1742)
- October 16 – Alexander Wilson, Scottish polymath (born 1714)
- November 10 – John Hope, Scottish physician and botanist (born 1725)
