= 1793 in science =

The year 1793 in science and technology involved some significant events.

== Events ==
- August 8 – The French Academy of Sciences is among the academies suppressed by the National Convention.
- October 24 – The French Republican Calendar, devised by Gilbert Romme, is adopted by the National Convention.

== Exploration ==
- July 20 – Scottish explorer Alexander Mackenzie's 1792–1793 Peace River expedition to the Pacific Ocean reaches its goal at Bella Coola, British Columbia, making him the first known person to complete a transcontinental crossing of northern North America.

== Biology ==
- June 10 – Muséum national d'histoire naturelle formally established in Paris by the National Convention of the French First Republic.
- Christian Konrad Sprengel publishes Das entdeckte Geheimnis der Natur im Bau und in der Befruchtung der Blumen in Berlin, pioneering the study of pollination ecology.

== Chemistry ==
- Scottish chemist Thomas Charles Hope confirms the existence of the alkaline earth metal which he names strontites; later isolated as strontium.

== Medicine ==
- Matthew Baillie publishes The Morbid Anatomy of Some of the Most Important Parts of the Human Body, considered the first systematic study of pathology and the first publication in English on it as a separate subject. He is credited with first identifying transposition of the great vessels and situs inversus.
- John Bell begins publication in Edinburgh of The Anatomy of the Bones, Muscles & Joints (the first volume of The Anatomy of the Human Body, which will go through at least seven editions) and Discourses on the Nature and Cure of Wounds with illustrations by himself and his brother Charles.
- Yellow Fever epidemic in Philadelphia in the United States.
- Dominique Jean Larrey, chief surgeon of the French Revolutionary Army, creates the first battlefield "flying ambulance" service.

== Metrology ==
- The grave, the original name for the kilogram, is defined by the Commission of Weights and Measures of the French Academy of Sciences.

== Technology ==
- May 15 – Spanish inventor Diego Marín Aguilera flies a glider for about 360 m (1,180ft).
- October 28 – Eli Whitney applies for a United States patent for his cotton gin (the patent is granted the following March).
- Hannah Slater applies for a United States patent for her new method of producing sewing thread from cotton.

== Awards ==
- Copley Medal: Not awarded

== Births ==
- January 31 – Joseph Paul Gaimard, French naval surgeon and naturalist (died 1858)
- April 15 – Friedrich Georg Wilhelm Struve, Baltic astronomer (died 1864)
- April – Thomas Addison, English physician and scientist (suicide 1860)
- May 6 – William Dick, Scottish veterinarian (died 1866)
- July 13 – George Green, English mathematician (died 1841)
- July 18 – Jean-Alfred Gautier, Swiss astronomer (died 1881)

== Deaths ==
- April 21 – John Michell, English geologist (born 1724)
- May 20 – Charles Bonnet, Genevan naturalist (born 1720)
- May 26 – Eliza Lucas, American agronomist (born 1722)
- May 28 – Anton Friedrich Büsching, German geographer (born 1724)
- June 26 – Gilbert White, English naturalist (born 1720)
- August 21 – James Small, Scottish inventor (born 1740)
- September 26 – Jean Baptiste François Pierre Bulliard, French mycologist (born c. 1742)
- October 16 – John Hunter, Scottish surgeon, pathologist and comparative anatomist (born 1728)
