= 1717 in science =

The year 1717 in science and technology involved:

== Biology ==
- Thomas Fairchild, a nurseryman at Hoxton in the East End of London, becomes the first person to produce a successful scientific plant hybrid, Dianthus Caryophyllus barbatus, known as "Fairchild's Mule" because it is infertile.
- James Petiver publishes Papilionum Brittaniae Icones, the first book devoted exclusively to British butterflies, giving English names to a number of species.

== Births ==
- June 5 – Emanuel Mendes da Costa, English botanist (died 1791)
- June 28 – Matthew Stewart, Scottish mathematician (died 1785)
- September 11 – Pehr Wilhelm Wargentin, Swedish astronomer (died 1783)
- November 16 – Jean le Rond d'Alembert, French mathematician (died 1783)
- Pierre Le Roy, French clockmaker (died 1785)
- Wilhelm Friedrich von Gleichen, German microscopist (died 1783)

== Deaths ==
- January 13 – Maria Sibylla Merian, German-born naturalist (born 1647)
- March 8 – Abraham Darby I, English ironmaster (born 1678)
