= 1779 in science =

The year 1779 in science and technology involved some significant events.

== Astronomy ==
- March 23 – Edward Pigott discovers the Black Eye Galaxy (M64).
- May 5 – The spiral galaxy M61 is discovered in the constellation Virgo by Barnabus Oriani.

== Exploration ==
- Horace-Bénédict de Saussure begins publication of Voyages dans les Alpes.

== Mathematics ==
- Étienne Bézout publishes Théorie générale des équations algébriques in Paris, containing original work on elimination theory.

== Physics ==
- Jean-Paul Marat publishes Découvertes de M. Marat sur le feu, l'électricité et la lumière (Discoveries of Mr Marat on Fire, Electricity and Light).

== Technology ==
- January 8 – Bryan Higgins is granted a British patent for hydraulic cement (stucco) for use as an exterior plaster.
- May – Boulton and Watt's Smethwick Engine is brought into service for pumping on the Birmingham Canal Navigations; two centuries later it will become the oldest working steam engine in the world.
- James Pickard first applies a crank and flywheel to a Newcomen atmospheric engine to produce circular motion.
- The Iron Bridge is erected across the River Severn in Shropshire, England; the first all-cast-iron bridge ever built. It will open to traffic on January 1, 1781.
- The spinning mule is perfected by the Lancashire inventor Samuel Crompton.
- The British Royal Navy adopts the carronade.
- The Girandoni Air Rifle is designed in Austria.

== Births ==
- January 5 – General Zebulon Pike, American explorer (died 1813)
- May 1 – Alexander Morison, Scottish physician and psychiatrist (died 1866)
- August 7
  - Jöns Jacob Berzelius, Swedish chemist (died 1848)
  - Louis de Freycinet, French explorer of coastal regions of Western Australia (died 1842)

== Deaths ==
- January 22 – Jeremiah Dixon, English surveyor and astronomer (born 1733)
- February 14 – James Cook, English explorer (born 1728)
- April 11 – Joseph de Jussieu, French botanist (born 1704)
- June 28 – Martha Daniell Logan, American botanist (born 1704)
- October 18 – Patrick d'Arcy, Irish-born mathematician (born 1725)
- November 16 – Pehr Kalm, Swedish botanist (born 1716)
- undated – John Kay, English inventor (born 1704)
