= 1732 in science =

The year 1732 in science and technology involved some significant events.

== Chemistry ==
- Herman Boerhaave publishes the authorized edition of his Elementa chemiae in Leiden.

== Exploration ==
- March 3 – English Captain Charles Gough rediscovers Gough Island in the South Atlantic.
- August – Mikhail Gvozdev with navigator Ivan Fyodorov in the Sviatoi Gavriil make the first known crossing of the Bering Strait, from Cape Dezhnev to Cape Prince of Wales, and explore the Alaskan coast.

== Metrology ==
- French astronomer in Russian service Joseph-Nicolas Delisle invents the Delisle scale for measuring temperature (recalibrated in 1738).

== Technology ==
- Henri Pitot develops the Pitot tube used for measuring flow velocity under the Seine bridges.
- The world's first lightship is moored at the Nore in the Thames Estuary of England.

== Awards ==
- Copley Medal: Stephen Gray

== Births ==
- January 11 – Peter Forsskål, Finnish naturalist (died 1763)
- October 6 – Nevil Maskelyne, English Astronomer Royal (died 1811)
- October 24 – Cristina Roccati, Italian scholar in physics (died 1797)
- Maria Christina Bruhn, Swedish inventor, (died 1802)

== Deaths ==
- January 17 – John Horsley, British archaeologist (born c. 1685)
