= 1719 in science =

The year 1719 in science and technology involved some significant events some of which are enumerated here.

== Botany ==
- Johann Jacob Dillenius publishes Catalogus plantarum sponte c. Gissam nascentium.
- Michael Bernhard Valentini publishes Viridarium reformatum, seu regnum vegetabilis Das ist eingerichtet und-Neu-buch vollständiges Kräuter, Worinnen alfo noch nicht geschehen Weise, als Kräutern Vegetabilien CRF, Sträuchen, Bäumen, Bluhmen Erd-und anderer Art Gewachsen, Krafft und beschreiben werden Würckung dergestalter, dass man dieses Werck statt einer Botanischen Bibliotheca haben, jedes zu seiner rechten Haupt Kraut-Art bringen, dessen Nutzen auch in der deutlich Artzney umständlich und finden ... (Anton Heinscheidt, Frankfurt am Main). These two volumes contain many illustrated plates from various botanical works for the Florilegium novum and Florilegium and renovatum auctum of Johannes Theodorus de Bry (1561–1623) and others.

== Mathematics ==
- Paul Halcke discovers the smallest Euler brick.

== Births ==
- January 23 – John Landen, English mathematician (died 1790)
- August 4 – Johann Gottlob Lehmann, German geologist (died 1767)
- August 20 – Christian Mayer, German astronomer (died 1783)
- September 27 – Abraham Gotthelf Kästner, German mathematician (died 1800)
- October 20 – Gottfried Achenwall, German statistician (died 1772)
- November 17 – Marie Marguerite Bihéron, French anatomist (died 1795)

== Deaths ==
- January 12 – John Flamsteed, English astronomer (born 1646)
- March 13 – Johann Friedrich Böttger, German alchemist and developer of porcelain manufacture (born 1682)
- June 24 – James Sutherland, Scottish botanist (born c.1638/9)
- November 8 – Michel Rolle, French mathematician (born 1652)
- December 28 – Jacob Bobart the Younger, English botanist (born 1641)
