= 1728 in science =

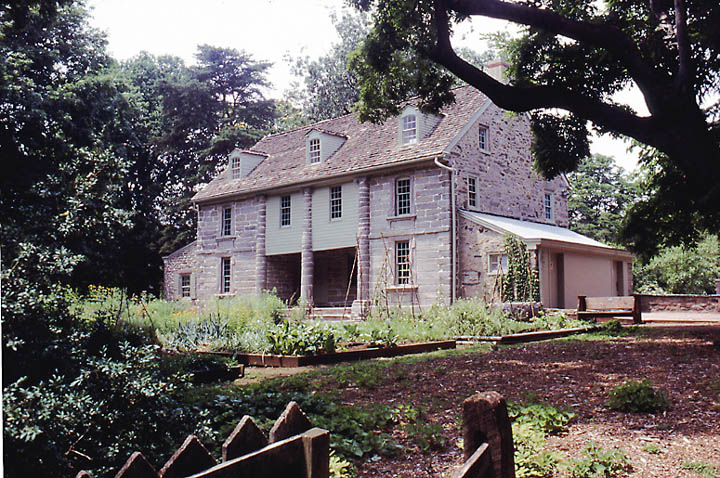
East facade of John Bartram House, Bartram's Garden, Philadelphia, PA

The year 1728 in science and technology involved some significant events.

== Astronomy ==
- James Bradley uses stellar aberration (first observed in 1725) to calculate the speed of light to be approximately 301,000 km/s.
- James Bradley observes nutation of the Earth's axis.

== Botany ==
- September – Bartram's Garden, the oldest surviving botanic garden in North America, is established in Philadelphia by John Bartram.

== Exploration ==
- July 14 – August 14 – Vitus Bering sails northward from the Kamchatka Peninsula, through the Bering Strait, and rounds Cape Dezhnev.

== Physiology and medicine ==
- Pierre Fauchard publishes Le Chirurgien Dentiste, ou, Traité des Dents, the first comprehensive text on dentistry, including the first description of orthodontic braces.

== Births ==
- February 13 – John Hunter, Scottish surgeon, pathologist and comparative anatomist (died 1793)
- March 20 – Samuel-Auguste Tissot, Swiss physician (died 1797)
- April 16 – Joseph Black, Scottish physicist and chemist (died 1799)
- August 26 – Johann Heinrich Lambert, Swiss polymath (died 1777)
- September 3 – Matthew Boulton, English mechanical engineer (died 1809)
- October 27 – James Cook, English explorer (died 1779)

== Deaths ==
- April 25 – John Woodward, English naturalist (born 1665)
- August 11 – William Sherard, English botanist (born 1659)
- Caleb Threlkeld, Irish botanist (born 1676)
