= 1626 in science =

List of years in science	(table)
- … 1616; 1617; 1618; 1619; 1620; 1621; 1622; 1623; 1624; 1625; 1626; 1627; 1628; 1629; 1630; 1631; 1632; 1633; 1634; 1635; 1636 …
- Art; Archaeology; Architecture; Literature; Music; Philosophy; Science; +...

The year 1626 in science and technology involved some significant events.

== Physiology and medicine ==
- Posthumous publication of Adriaan van den Spiegel's De formato foetu in Venice with illustrations by Giulio Casserio and including the first observation of milk in female breasts at birth.

== Technology ==
- Cornelius Vermuyden commissioned to drain Hatfield Chase on the Isle of Axholme in Lincolnshire, England.

== Births ==
- February 18 or 19 – Francesco Redi, Italian physician, biologist and poet (died 1697)
- March 1 – Jean-Baptiste de La Quintinie, French horticulturalist (died 1688)
- April 7 – Ole Borch (Olaus Borrichius), Danish chemist, physician, grammarian and poet (died 1690)
- approx. date – Pietro Mengoli, Italian mathematician (died 1686)

== Deaths ==
- February 11 – Pietro Cataldi, Italian mathematician (born 1548)
- April 9 – Francis Bacon, English philosopher and a founder of modern scientific research (born 1561)
- April 11 – Marin Getaldić or Ghetaldi, Ragusan politician, mathematician and physicist, contributed to the emergence of new algebra (born 1568)
- April 14 – Gaspare Aselli, Italian anatomist (born c. 1581)
- June 21 – Anselmus Boëtius de Boodt, Flemish-born humanist, priest, physician and mineralogist (born c. 1550)
- October 30 – Willebrord Snellius, Dutch mathematician and physicist who devised the basic law of refraction, known as Snell's law (born 1580)
- December 10 – Edmund Gunter, English mathematician (born 1581)

=== Unknown date ===
- Salomon de Caus, French mechanical and hydraulic engineer (born 1576)
