= 1628 in science =

| List of years in science | (table) |
- … 1618; 1619; 1620; 1621; 1622; 1623; 1624; 1625; 1626; 1627; 1628; 1629; 1630; 1631; 1632; 1633; 1634; 1635; 1636; 1637; 1638 …
- Art; Archaeology; Architecture; Literature; Music; Philosophy; Science; +...

The year 1628 in science and technology involved some significant events.

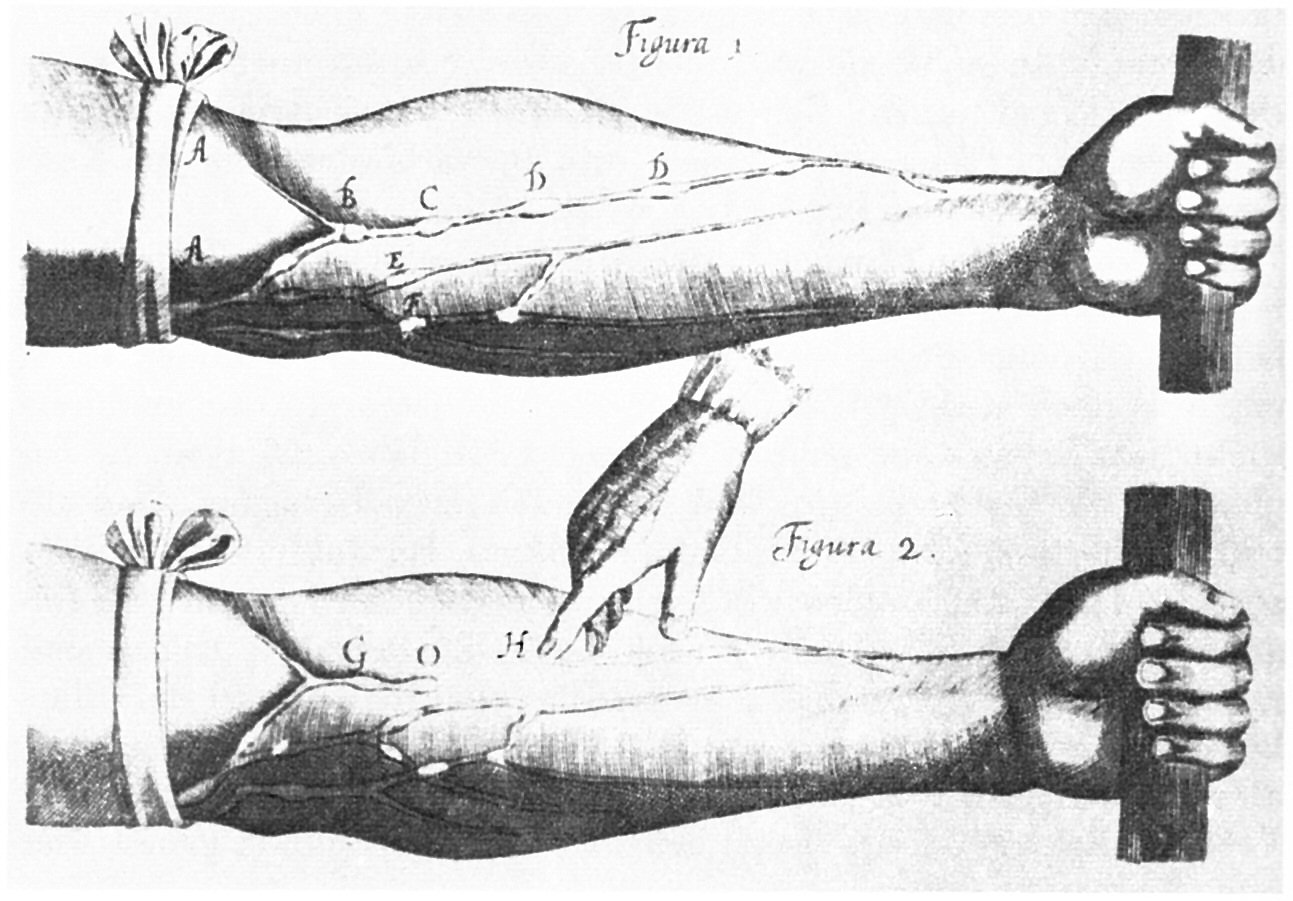
from Harvey's De Motu Cordis

== Medicine and physiology ==
- William Harvey publishes his findings about blood circulation in Exercitatio Anatomica de Motu Cordis et Sanguinis in Animalibus (published in Frankfurt).

== Births ==
- March 10 – Marcello Malpighi, Italian physiologist (died 1694)
- April 23 – Johann van Waveren Hudde, Dutch mathematician (died 1704)
- Constantijn Huygens, Dutch statesman and telescope maker (died 1697)

== Deaths ==
- June 8 – Rudolph Goclenius, German philosopher and polymath (born 1547)
- Yi Su-gwang, Korean scholar-bureaucrat (born 1563)
