= 1625 in science =

| List of years in science | (table) |
- … 1615; 1616; 1617; 1618; 1619; 1620; 1621; 1622; 1623; 1624; 1625; 1626; 1627; 1628; 1629; 1630; 1631; 1632; 1633; 1634; 1635 …
- Art; Archaeology; Architecture; Literature; Music; Philosophy; Science; +...

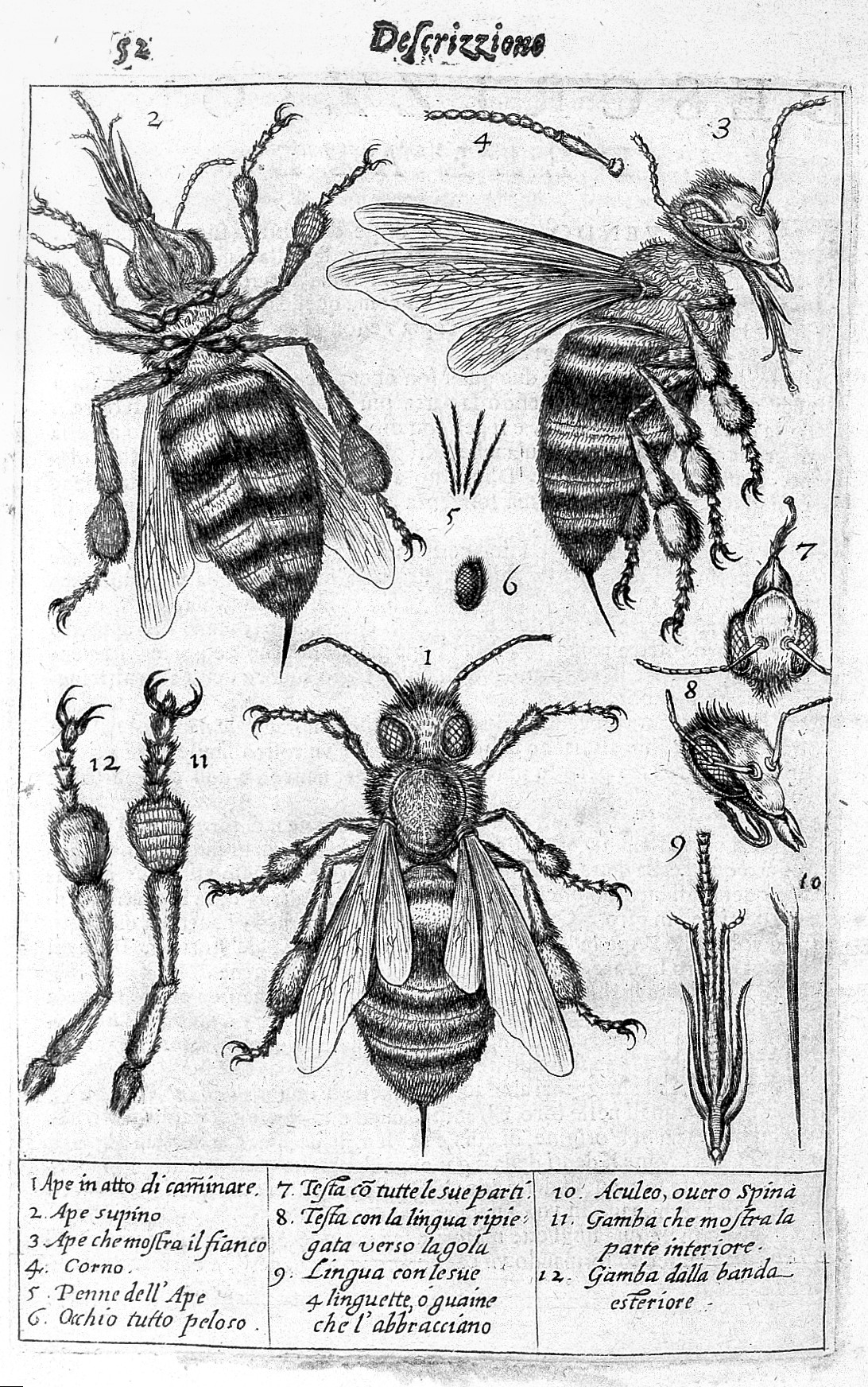
Bee drawing with zoomed parts

The year 1625 in science and technology involved some significant events.

== Chemistry ==
- First description of hydrogen by Johann Baptista van Helmont. First to use the word "gas".
- Johann Rudolf Glauber discovers sodium sulfate (sal mirabilis or "Glauber's salt", used as a laxative) in Austrian spring water.

== Births ==
- June 8 – Giovanni Cassini, Italian astronomer (died 1712)
- March 25 – John Collins, English mathematician (died 1683)
- August 13 – Rasmus Bartholin, Danish scientist (died 1698)
- December 16 – Erhard Weigel, German mathematician and scientific populariser (died 1699)
- December 20 – David Gregory, Scottish physician and inventor (died 1720)
- Samuel Morland, English inventor (died 1695)

== Deaths ==
- March 7 – Johann Bayer, German uranographer (born 1572)
- April 7 – Adriaan van den Spiegel, Flemish-born anatomist and botanist (born 1578)
- May 6 – George Bruce of Carnock, Scottish coal mining engineer (born c.1550)
- Ferrante Imperato, Neapolitan natural historian (born 1550)
- Willem Schouten, Dutch navigator, died at sea (born c. 1567)
