= 1630 in science =

List of years in science	(table)
- … 1620; 1621; 1622; 1623; 1624; 1625; 1626; 1627; 1628; 1629; 1630; 1631; 1632; 1633; 1634; 1635; 1636; 1637; 1638; 1639; 1640 …
- Art; Archaeology; Architecture; Literature; Music; Philosophy; Science; +...

The year 1630 in science and technology involved some significant events.

== Astronomy ==
- Following his recently completed Rudolphine Tables, Kepler predicts a transit of Mercury on 7 November 1631 and a transit of Venus on 6 December 1631. He writes an "admonition" to astronomers to prepare for observations on these dates, which is published after his death by Jacob Bartsch.

== Mathematics ==
- Pierre de Fermat studies the curve later known as the "Witch of Agnesi".

== Microscopy ==
- Francesco Stelluti's Persio tradotto in verso schiolto e dichiarato, published in Rome, is the first book to contain images of organisms viewed through the microscope.

== Technology ==
- Cornelius Drebbel produces an early form of magic lantern or slide projector.

== Events ==
- The first laws prohibiting gambling in America are passed.

== Births ==
- July 19 – François Cureau de La Chambre, French physician (died 1680)
- September 13 – Olof Rudbeck, Swedish physiologist (died 1702)
- October – Isaac Barrow, English mathematician (died 1677)
- possible date – Johann Kunckel, German chemist (died 1703)

== Deaths ==
- November 15 – Johannes Kepler, astronomer (born 1571)
- Federico Cesi, founder of Accademia Nazionale dei Lincei, in Rome, Italy (born 1586)
- Johannes Schreck (also known as Johannes Terrenz or Terrentius), explorer (born 1576)
