= 1624 in science =

List of years in science	(table)
- … 1614; 1615; 1616; 1617; 1618; 1619; 1620; 1621; 1622; 1623; 1624; 1625; 1626; 1627; 1628; 1629; 1630; 1631; 1632; 1633; 1634 …
- Art; Archaeology; Architecture; Literature; Music; Philosophy; Science; +...

The year 1624 in science and technology involved some significant events.

== Astronomy ==
- Jakob Bartsch's star atlas is the first to depict six recently discovered constellations, including Camelopardalis around the North Star.

== Exploration ==
- July or August – Portuguese Jesuit priest António de Andrade becomes the first European to enter Tibet.

== Mathematics ==
- Henry Briggs publishes Arithmetica Logarithmica.
- Edmund Gunter produces The description and use of sector, the cross-staffe, and other instruments for such as are studious of mathematical practise, notable for being published in English as a practical text.

== Medicine ==
- Adriaan van den Spiegel, in De semitertiana libri quatuor, gives the first comprehensive description of malaria.

== Technology ==
- 12 September – Cornelis Drebbel demonstrates his third submarine on the River Thames in England.
- The 15-arch Berwick Bridge in Great Britain by James Burrell is opened to traffic.

== Events ==
- 25 May – The Parliament of England passes the Statute of Monopolies, requiring patent monopolies to show novelty.
- The Parlement of France passes a decree forbidding criticism of Aristotle on pain of death.

== Births ==
- 10 September – Thomas Sydenham, English physician, the first person to recommend the use of quinine for relieving symptoms of malaria (died 1689)

== Deaths ==
- Giuseppe Biancani, Italian astronomer (born 1566)
- 5 December – Gaspard Bauhin, Swiss botanist and physician who developed an important early plant classification system (born 1560)
- 26 December – Simon Marius, German astronomer (born 1573)
