= 1641 in science =

List of years in science	(table)
- … 1631; 1632; 1633; 1634; 1635; 1636; 1637; 1638; 1639; 1640; 1641; 1642; 1643; 1644; 1645; 1646; 1647; 1648; 1649; 1650; 1651 …
- Art; Archaeology; Architecture; Literature; Music; Philosophy; Science; +...

The year 1641 in science and technology involved some significant events.

== Medicine ==
- Nicolaes Tulp's Observationes Medicae is published in Amsterdam.

== Technology ==
- The sealed thermometer is developed with Ferdinand II, Grand Duke of Tuscany, using a glass tube containing alcohol, which freezes well below the freezing point of water.
- Samuel Winslow is granted the first patent in North America by the Massachusetts General Court for a new saltmaking process.

== Births ==
- March – Menno van Coehoorn, Dutch military engineer (died 1704)
- July 30 – Regnier de Graaf, Dutch physician and anatomist who discovered the ovarian follicles, which were later named Graafian follicles (died 1673)
- August 2 – Jacob Bobart the Younger, English botanist (died 1719)
- September 26 – Nehemiah Grew, English botanist and physician who makes some of the early microscopical observations of plants (died 1712)
- October 28 – Sir Philip Skippon, English traveller, naturalist and Member of Parliament (died 1691)

== Deaths ==
- January 3 – Jeremiah Horrocks, English astronomer (born 1618)
- March 8 – Xu Xiake, Chinese explorer and geographer (born 1587)
- July 5 – Simon Baskerville, English physician (born 1574)
- August 31 – Guy de La Brosse, French physician and botanist (born c. 1586)
