= 1638 in science =

List of years in science	(table)
- … 1628; 1629; 1630; 1631; 1632; 1633; 1634; 1635; 1636; 1637; 1638; 1639; 1640; 1641; 1642; 1643; 1644; 1645; 1646; 1647; 1648 …
- Art; Archaeology; Architecture; Literature; Music; Philosophy; Science; +...

The year 1638 in science and technology involved some significant events.

== Astronomy ==
- December 21 – Total eclipse of the Moon falls on the same day as the winter solstice, for the first time in the Common Era.

== Geology ==
- March 27 earthquake in Calabria (Italy).
- June 8 earthquake in Calabria. The epicentre was in Crotone.

== Physics ==
- The final book of the now-blind Galileo, Discorsi e dimostrazioni matematiche, intorno à due nuove scienze is published in Leiden, dealing with the strength of materials and the motion of objects. In it, he discusses the square–cube law, the law of falling bodies and infinity. He also discusses his experimental method for measuring the speed of light; he has been unable to determine it over a short distance.

== Publications ==
- Publication of The Man in the Moone, or the Discovrse of a Voyage thither "by Domingo Gonsales" (actually by Francis Godwin, Bishop of Hereford (died 1633)), an early example of science fiction.

== Births ==
- January 1 (NS January 11) – Nicolas Steno, Danish pioneer of geology (died 1686)
- March 28 – Frederik Ruysch, Dutch physician and anatomist (died 1731)
- April 19 - Niccolao Manucci, Italian physician, writer and traveller (died 1717)
- May 11 – Guy-Crescent Fagon, French physician and botanist (died 1718)
- June 8 – Pierre Magnol, French botanist (died 1715)
- June 29 - Heinrich Meibom, German physician and scholar (died 1700)
- July 22 - Theodor Kerckring, Dutch anatomist and chemical physician (died 1693)
- November 21 - Luca Tozzi, Italian physician (died 1717)
- November – James Gregory, Scottish mathematician and astronomer (died 1675)
- Paolo Falconieri, Florentine polymath (died 1704)

== Deaths ==
- February 26 – Claude Gaspard Bachet de Méziriac, French mathematician (born 1581)
- April 15/16 – John Tradescant the elder, English botanist (born c. 1570s)
- October 21 – Willem Blaeu, Dutch cartographer (born 1571)
- October 29 – Adrian von Mynsicht, German alchemist (born 1603)
- December 7 - Epifanio Ferdinando, Italian physician and philosoph (born 1569)
