= 1631 in science =

List of years in science	(table)
- … 1621; 1622; 1623; 1624; 1625; 1626; 1627; 1628; 1629; 1630; 1631; 1632; 1633; 1634; 1635; 1636; 1637; 1638; 1639; 1640; 1641 …
- Art; Archaeology; Architecture; Literature; Music; Philosophy; Science; +...

The year 1631 in science and technology involved some significant events.

== Astronomy ==
- November 7 – Using Kepler's predictions of planetary transits made in 1630, Pierre Gassendi makes the first recorded observation of the transit of Mercury. The observed size of Mercury's disc is significantly smaller than had been expected from Ptolemaic theory.

== Geology ==
- December 16 – Volcanic eruption of Mount Vesuvius for the only time this century.

== Mathematics ==
- William Oughtred publishes Clavis Mathematicae, introducing the multiplication sign (×) and proportion sign (::).
- Some of Thomas Harriot's writings on algebra are published posthumously as Artis Analyticae Praxis.

== Technology ==
- Earliest known bentside spinet, made by Hieronymus de Zentis.

== Births ==
- approx. date
  - William Ball, English astronomer (died 1690)
  - Richard Lower, English physician, performs first direct blood transfusion (died 1691)

== Deaths ==
- October 20 – Michael Maestlin, German astronomer and mathematician (born 1550)
- October 26 – Catherine de Parthenay, French noblewoman and mathematician (b. 1554)
- December 10 – Sir Hugh Myddelton, Welsh-born goldsmith and hydraulic engineer (born c. 1560)
