= 1635 in science =

List of years in science	(table)
- … 1625; 1626; 1627; 1628; 1629; 1630; 1631; 1632; 1633; 1634; 1635; 1636; 1637; 1638; 1639; 1640; 1641; 1642; 1643; 1644; 1645 …
- Art; Archaeology; Architecture; Literature; Music; Philosophy; Science; +...

The year 1635 in science and technology involved some significant events.

== Botany ==
- Jardin des Plantes, Paris, planted as a physic garden by Guy de La Brosse.

== Publication ==
- Guillaume de Baillou's Opera medica omnia, Paris.

== Births ==
- May 9 – J. J. Becher, German physician and chemist (died 1682)
- July 18 – Robert Hooke, English scientist and inventor (died 1703)
- November 22 – Francis Willughby, English ornithologist and ichthyologist (died 1672)

== Deaths ==
- September 16 – Metius, Dutch mathematician (born 1571)
- October 22 – Wilhelm Schickard, German professor of Hebrew and Astronomy (born 1592)
- John Mason, English explorer (born 1586)
