= 1639 in science =

List of years in science	(table)
- … 1629; 1630; 1631; 1632; 1633; 1634; 1635; 1636; 1637; 1638; 1639; 1640; 1641; 1642; 1643; 1644; 1645; 1646; 1647; 1648; 1649 …
- Art; Archaeology; Architecture; Literature; Music; Philosophy; Science; +...

The year 1639 in science and technology involved some significant events.

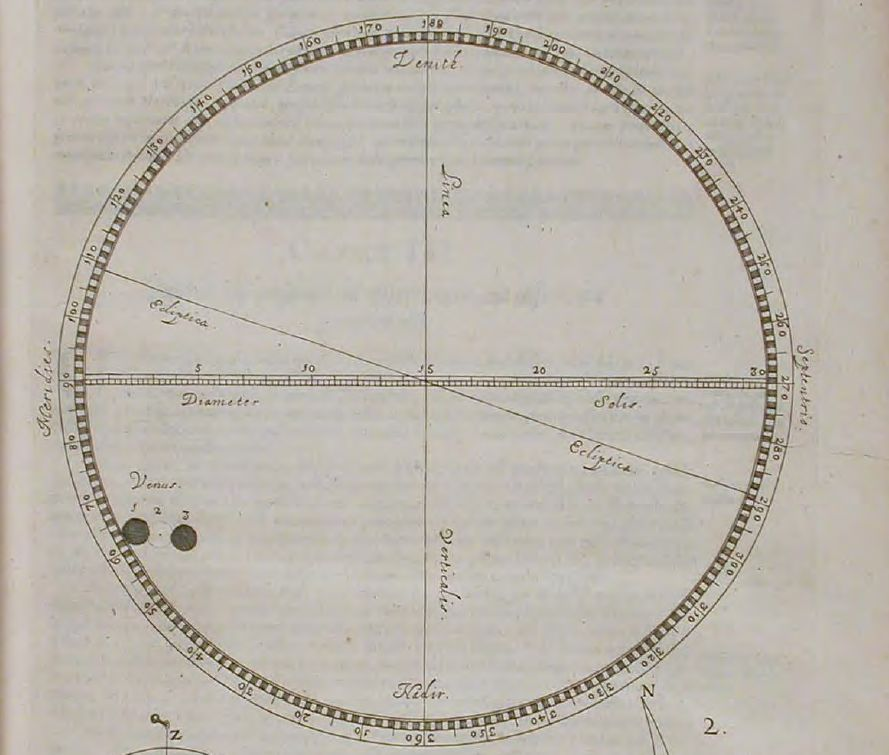
Jeremah Horrock's observation of Venus transit across the Sun in 1639. From his work Venus in sole visa, printed 1662

== Astronomy ==
- Giovanni Battista Zupi observes that the planet Mercury has orbital phases.
- December 4 (November 24 in Julian calendar) – English astronomers Jeremiah Horrocks and William Crabtree are the first and only scientific observers of a transit of Venus, predicted by Horrocks.

== Exploration ==
- The Casiquiare canal, a river forming a natural canal between the Amazon River and Orinoco River basins, is first encountered by Europeans

== Mathematics ==
- Girard Desargues introduces the concept of infinity into geometry.

== Births ==
- April 12 – Martin Lister, English naturalist and physician (died 1712)
- December 18 – Gottfried Kirch, German astronomer (died 1710)
- approx. date – Daniel Greysolon, Sieur du Lhut, French explorer (died 1710)

== Deaths ==
- June 6 – Peter Crüger, German polymath (born 1580)
- August 7 – Martin van den Hove, Dutch astronomer (born 1605)
- Mutio Oddi, Italian mathematician (born 1569)
