= 1622 in science =

List of years in science	(table)
- … 1612; 1613; 1614; 1615; 1616; 1617; 1618; 1619; 1620; 1621; 1622; 1623; 1624; 1625; 1626; 1627; 1628; 1629; 1630; 1631; 1632 …
- Art; Archaeology; Architecture; Literature; Music; Philosophy; Science; +...

The year 1622 in science and technology involved some significant events.

== Mathematics ==
- The slide rule is invented by William Oughtred (1574–1660), an English mathematician, and later becomes the calculating tool of choice until the electronic calculator takes over in the early 1970s.

== Physiology and medicine ==
- Gaspare Aselli discovers the lacteal vessels of the lymphatic system.
- Flemish anatomist Giulio Casserio publishes Nova anatomia in Frankfurt, containing clear copperplate engravings of the human anatomy.

== Technology ==
- February 22 – An English patent is granted for Dud Dudley's process for smelting iron ore with coke.

== Births ==
- January 28 – Adrien Auzout, French astronomer (died 1691)
- March 10 – Johann Rahn, Swiss mathematician (died 1676)
- April 5 – Vincenzo Viviani, Italian mathematician and scientist (died 1703)
- undated – Jean Pecquet, French anatomist (died 1674)

== Deaths ==
- January 23 – William Baffin, English explorer and navigator (born 1584)
- February 19 – Sir Henry Savile, English polymath and benefactor (born 1549)
- April 13 – Katharina Kepler, German healer and mother of Johannes Kepler (born 1546)
- May 15 – Petrus Plancius, Flemish cartographer and cosmographer (born 1552)
