= 1640 in science =

List of years in science	(table)
- … 1630; 1631; 1632; 1633; 1634; 1635; 1636; 1637; 1638; 1639; 1640; 1641; 1642; 1643; 1644; 1645; 1646; 1647; 1648; 1649; 1650 …
- Art; Archaeology; Architecture; Literature; Music; Philosophy; Science; +...

The year 1640 in science and technology involved some significant events.

== Botany ==
- John Parkinson publishes Theatrum Botanicum:The Theater of Plants, or, An Herbal of a Large Extent.

== Mathematics ==
- The 16-year-old Blaise Pascal demonstrates the properties of the hexagrammum mysticum in his Essai pour les coniques which he sends to Mersenne.
- October 18 – Fermat states his "little theorem" in a letter to Frénicle de Bessy: if p is a prime number, then for any integer a, a^{p} − a will be divisible by p.
- December 25 – Fermat claims a proof of the theorem on sums of two squares in a letter to Mersenne ("Fermat's Christmas Theorem"): an odd prime p is expressible as the sum of two squares.

== Technology ==
- The micrometer is developed.
- A form of bayonet is invented; in later years it will gradually replace the pike.
- The reticle telescope is developed and initiates the birth of sharpshooting.

== Births ==
- April 1 – Georg Mohr, Danish mathematician (died 1697)
- December 13 (bapt.) – Robert Plot, English naturalist and chemist and illustrator of the first dinosaur fossil (died 1696)
- Elias Tillandz, Swedish physician and botanist in Finland (died 1693)

== Deaths ==
- December 22 – Jean de Beaugrand, French mathematician (born c. 1584)
