= 1642 in science =

List of years in science	(table)
- … 1632; 1633; 1634; 1635; 1636; 1637; 1638; 1639; 1640; 1641; 1642; 1643; 1644; 1645; 1646; 1647; 1648; 1649; 1650; 1651; 1652 …
- Art; Archaeology; Architecture; Literature; Music; Philosophy; Science; +...

The year 1642 in science and technology involved some significant events.

== Astronomy ==
- Rundetårn astronomical observatory for the University of Copenhagen is completed, as is also the Panzano Observatory.

== Computing ==
- 19-year-old Blaise Pascal begins to develop the Pascaline, the first practical mechanical calculator, initially to help with the recording of taxes.

== Exploration ==
- November 24 – Abel Tasman, Dutch explorer, is the first European known to sight Tasmania, which he names Anthoonij van Diemenslandt.
- December 13 – Tasman is the first European known to sight New Zealand.

== Technology ==
- Opening throughout of the Briare Canal in France, the first summit level canal in Europe built using pound locks.
- The printmaking process of mezzotint is developed by Ludwig von Siegen.

== Births ==
- March (possible date) – Seki Takakazu, Japanese mathematician (died 1708)
- December 25 (OS) – Isaac Newton, English polymath (died 1727)

== Deaths ==
- January 8 – Galileo Galilei, Italian astronomer (born 1564)
