= 1621 in science =

List of years in science	(table)
- … 1611; 1612; 1613; 1614; 1615; 1616; 1617; 1618; 1619; 1620; 1621; 1622; 1623; 1624; 1625; 1626; 1627; 1628; 1629; 1630; 1631 …
- Art; Archaeology; Architecture; Literature; Music; Philosophy; Science; +...

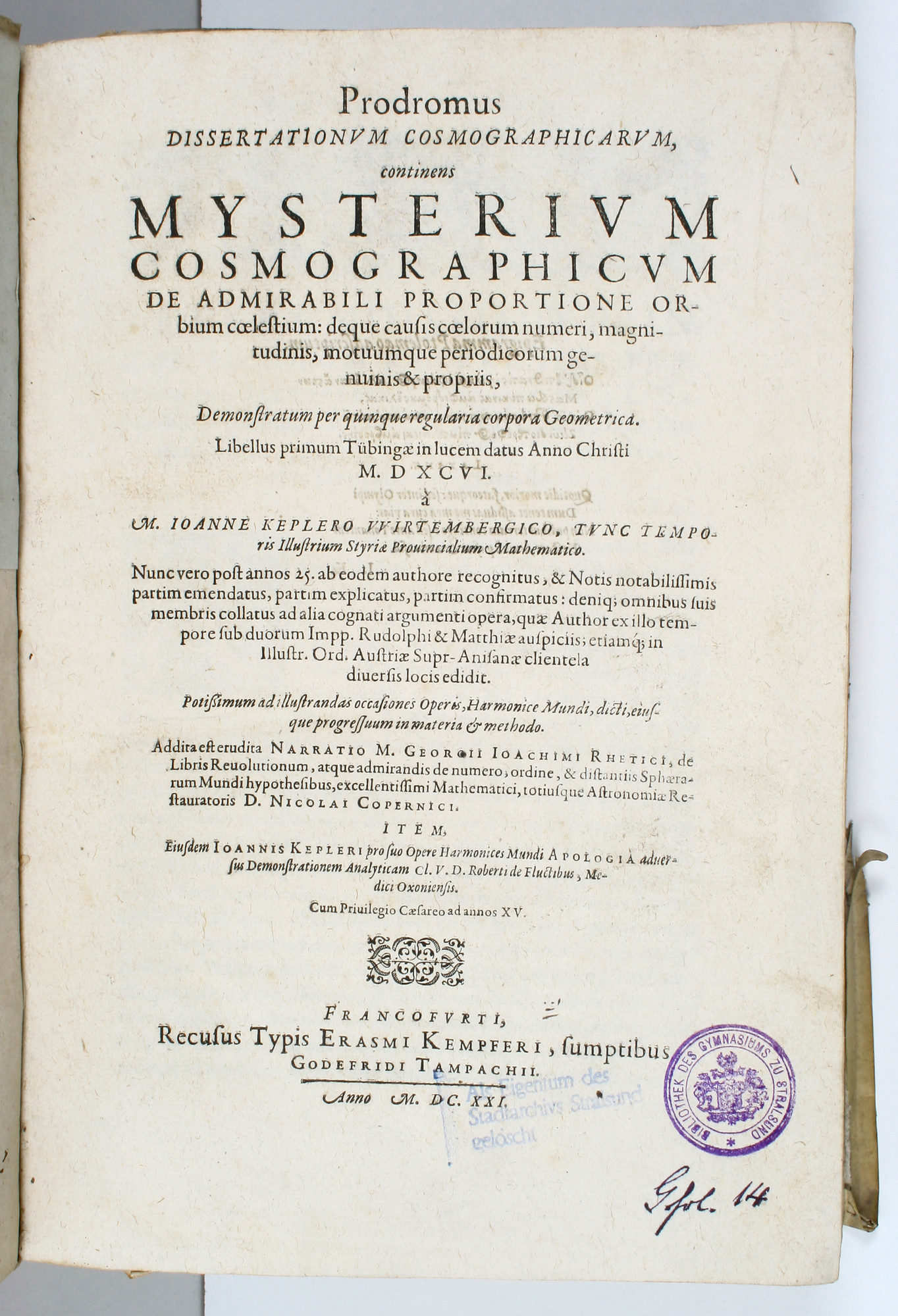

The year 1621 in science and technology involved some significant events.

== Astronomy ==
- Johann Schreck (1576–1630), also known as Johannes Schreck, Terrenz or Terrentius, introduces the telescope to China.

== Botany ==
- The University of Oxford Botanic Garden, the oldest botanical garden in Great Britain, is founded as a physic garden by Henry Danvers, 1st Earl of Danby.

== Medicine ==
- Robert Burton publishes his treatise The Anatomy of Melancholy.

== Physics ==
- Willebrord Snellius formulates Snell's law on refraction.

== Technology ==
- A simple microscope is developed.
- Cornelius Vermuyden begins reclamation of Canvey Island in England.

== Births ==
- January 27 – Thomas Willis, English physician who contributes to knowledge of the nervous and cardiovascular systems (died 1675)

== Deaths ==
- July 2 – Thomas Harriot, English ethnographer, astronomer and mathematician (born c. 1560)
- September 1 – Bahāʾ al-dīn al-ʿĀmilī, Arab philosopher and astronomer (born 1547)
- Jan Jesenius, Slovak physician (born 1566)
