= 1715 in science =

The year 1715 in science and technology involved some significant events.

== Astronomy ==
- May 3 – Total solar eclipse across southern England, Sweden and Finland (last total eclipse visible in London for almost 900 years).
- Edmond Halley suggests that nebulae are clouds of interstellar gas.
- Publication in London of David Gregory's The elements of astronomy, physical and geometrical... Done into English, containing the first recorded use in English of the word Physics in its modern scientific sense and the first mention of a series approximating the Titius–Bode law on celestial orbits.

== Discoveries ==
- Mine La Motte, in Madison county, Missouri, is discovered by De la Motte Cadillac.
- The "miracle" springs are discovered in Cheltenham, England, a small Cotswold village at the time.

== Geology ==
- Edmund Halley suggests using the salinity and evaporation of salt lakes to determine the age of the Earth.

== Mathematics ==
- Brook Taylor's Methodus Incrementorum Directa et Inversa adds a new branch to the higher mathematics, now designated the "calculus of finite differences", and introduces Taylor's theorem and the Taylor series.
- Taylor also publishes his Essay on Linear Perspective, which discusses the principles of perspective and the vanishing point.

== Medicine ==
- French anatomist Raymond Vieussens's Traité nouveau de la structure et des causes du mouvement naturel du coeur is published in Toulouse, giving the first description of valvular disease of the heart.

== Technology ==
- The first recognised fire extinguisher is invented.
- Construction of Brod Fortress by the Arduchy of Austria begins.
- approx. date – In clockmaking, George Graham invents his deadbeat escapement and experiments with compensation pendulums.

== Births ==
- April 3 – William Watson, English physician, botanist and physicist (died 1787)
- September 22 – Jean-Étienne Guettard, French physician and scientist (died 1786)
- October 8 – Michel Benoist, French Jesuit missionary and scientist (died 1774)
- November 13 – Dorothea Erxleben, German physician (died 1762)
- November 23 – Pierre Charles Le Monnier, French astronomer (died 1799)

== Deaths ==
- January 29 – Bernard Lamy, French mathematician, philosopher and physicist (born 1640)
- February 17 – Antoine Galland, French archaeologist (born 1646)
- March – William Dampier, English explorer, hydrographic surveyor and triple circumnavigator (born 1651)
- May – Thomas Savery, English engineer, inventor of a steam pump (born c. 1650)
- May 21 – Pierre Magnol, French botanist (born 1638)
- June 19 – Nicolas Lémery, French pharmacist and chemist (born 1645)
- August 16 – Raymond Vieussens, French anatomist (born c. 1635)
- September 24 – Wilhelm Homberg, Dutch chemist working in France (born 1652)
- October 15 – Humphry Ditton, English mathematician (born 1675)
- November 1 – Shibukawa Shunkai, Japanese scholar and astronomer (born 1637)
