= 1644 in science =

List of years in science	(table)
- … 1634; 1635; 1636; 1637; 1638; 1639; 1640; 1641; 1642; 1643; 1644; 1645; 1646; 1647; 1648; 1649; 1650; 1651; 1652; 1653; 1654 …
- Art; Archaeology; Architecture; Literature; Music; Philosophy; Science; +...

The year 1644 AD in science and technology involved several significant events in mathematics, technology, and medicine.

== Mathematics ==
- The Basel problem is posed by Pietro Mengoli, and will puzzle mathematicians until solved by Leonhard Euler in 1735.

== Technology ==
- Jacob van Eyck collaborates with the bellfounding duo Pieter and François Hemony to create the first tuned carillon in Zutphen.

== Publications ==
- Jan Baptist van Helmont publishes Dageraad ofte Nieuwe Opkomst der Geneeskunst ("Daybreak, or the New Rise of Medicine").

== Births ==
- 25 September – Ole Rømer, Danish astronomer who makes the first quantitative measurements of the speed of light (died 1710)

== Deaths ==
- 2 July – William Gascoigne, English scientist (born 1610)
- 30 December – Jan Baptist van Helmont, Flemish chemist (born 1580)
