= 1643 in science =

| List of years in science | (table) |
- … 1633; 1634; 1635; 1636; 1637; 1638; 1639; 1640; 1641; 1642; 1643; 1644; 1645; 1646; 1647; 1648; 1649; 1650; 1651; 1652; 1653 …
- Art; Archaeology; Architecture; Literature; Music; Philosophy; Science; +...

The year 1643 in science and technology involved some significant events.

== Exploration ==
- January 21 – Abel Tasman discovers the Tonga archipelago.
- December 25 – Captain William Mynors of the British East India Company discovers Christmas Island.

== Meteorology ==
- Evangelista Torricelli invents the mercury barometer.

== Births ==
- January 4 (NS) – Isaac Newton, English physicist (died 1727)
- Jean de Fontaney, French Jesuit mathematician and astronomer (died 1710)
- Pierre Dionis, French surgeon and anatomist (died 1718)

== Deaths ==
- April 9 – Benedetto Castelli, Italian mathematician (born 1578)
- November 3
  - John Bainbridge, English astronomer (born 1582)
  - Paul Guldin, Swiss mathematician and astronomer (born 1577)
- Sophia Brahe, Danish astronomer (born 1556)
- Gasparo Berti, Italian mathematician, astronomer and physicist (born c. 1600)
- Walter Warner, English scientist (born 1563)
