= 1765 in science =

List of years in science	(table)
- … 1755; 1756; 1757; 1758; 1759; 1760; 1761; 1762; 1763; 1764; 1765; 1766; 1767; 1768; 1769; 1770; 1771; 1772; 1773; 1774; 1775 …
- Art; Archaeology; Architecture; Literature; Music; Philosophy; Science; +...

The year 1765 in science and technology involved several significant events.

== Astronomy ==
- February 8 – Nevil Maskelyne becomes Astronomer Royal in England.

== Technology ==
- May – James Watt makes a breakthrough in the development of the steam engine by constructing a model with a separate condenser.
- October 15 – Gribeauval system for manufacture of cannon introduced in France by royal decree.
- Timișoara Fortress construction completed by the Habsburg Empire.

== Zoology ==
- Saverio Manetti begins publication of his Storia naturale degli uccelli, trattata con metodo e adornata di figure intagliate in rame e miniate al naturale. Ornithologia methodice digesta atque iconibus aeneis ad vivum illuminatis ornate ("Natural History of the Birds, treated systematically and adorned with copperplate engraving illustrations, in miniature and life-size") in Florence.

== Awards ==
- Copley Medal: Not awarded

== Births ==
- March 7 – Nicéphore Niépce, French inventor (died 1833)
- November 14 – Robert Fulton, American engineer (died 1815)
- December 8 – Eli Whitney, American inventor (died 1825)

== Deaths ==
- April 15 – Mikhail Lomonosov, Russian scientist (born 1711)
- May 7 – Alexis Clairaut, French mathematician (born 1713)
- September – Richard Pococke, English anthropologist and explorer (born 1704)
- December 25 – Václav Prokop Diviš, Czech theologian, natural scientist and pioneer in the field of electricity (born 1698)
