= 1646 in science =

List of years in science	(table)
- … 1636; 1637; 1638; 1639; 1640; 1641; 1642; 1643; 1644; 1645; 1646; 1647; 1648; 1649; 1650; 1651; 1652; 1653; 1654; 1655; 1656 …
- Art; Archaeology; Architecture; Literature; Music; Philosophy; Science; +...

The year 1646 in science and technology involved some significant events.

== Technology ==
- Pascal's law, a law of hydrostatics is developed, stating that, in a perfect fluid, the pressure exerted on it anywhere is transmitted equally.

== Publications ==
- Dr Thomas Browne's Pseudodoxia Epidemica is published in London, introducing the words electricity, medical, pathology, hallucination and computer to the English language and casting doubt on the theory of spontaneous generation.

== Births ==
- April 20 – Charles Plumier, French botanist (died 1704)
- July 1 – Gottfried Leibniz, German scientist and mathematician (died 1716)

== Deaths ==
- November 29 – Laurentius Paulinus Gothus, Swedish theologian and astronomer (born 1565)
