= 1645 in science =

List of years in science	(table)
- … 1635; 1636; 1637; 1638; 1639; 1640; 1641; 1642; 1643; 1644; 1645; 1646; 1647; 1648; 1649; 1650; 1651; 1652; 1653; 1654; 1655 …
- Art; Archaeology; Architecture; Literature; Music; Philosophy; Science; +...

The year 1645 in science and technology involved some significant events.

== Astronomy ==
- The Solar cycle enters the 70-year Maunder Minimum.
- First published map of the Moon produced by Michael van Langren.
- A version of the law of gravitation is suggested by Ismaël Bullialdus in his Astronomia philolaica.

== Medicine ==
- October 18 – English physician Daniel Whistler presents the first printed pediatric text on rickets, De Morbo puerili Anglorum, quern patrio idiomate indigense vocant "The Rickets", as his MD thesis at Leiden University.

== Technology ==
- A magic lantern is invented by Althanasius Kircher; like a slide projector, it could project enlarged drawings onto a wall.

== Publications ==
- Publication of Robert Dudley's Dell'Arcano del Mare begins in Italian at Florence. A comprehensive work on navigation, shipbuilding and astronomy, it includes an original maritime atlas of the entire world, which is the first such in print, the first made by an Englishman, and the first to use the Mercator projection.

== Births ==
- September 21 – Louis Jolliet, French Canadian explorer (died 1700)
- November 17 – Nicolas Lemery, French chemist (died 1715)

== Deaths ==
- approx. date – Jean de Chastelet, French mining engineer (born c. 1578)
