= 1630s in archaeology =

List of years in archaeology	(table)
- … 1620; 1621; 1622; 1623; 1624; 1625; 1626; 1627; 1628; 1629; 1630; 1631; 1632; 1633; 1634; 1635; 1636; 1637; 1638; 1639; 1640 …
- In science 1627 1628 1629 1630 1631 1632 1633
- Art; Archaeology; Architecture; Literature; Music; Philosophy; Science; +...

The decade of the 1630s in archaeology involved some significant events.

== Events ==
- 1632: Posthumous publication of Antonio Bosio's Roma Sotterranea, the results of his lifelong systematic exploration of the Roman catacombs.

== Births ==
- 1633: Giovanni Giustino Ciampini, Italian archeologist (d. 1698)
- 1635: February 1 - Marquard Gude, German archaeologist (d. 1689).

== Deaths ==
Preceded by 1620s in archaeology	Archaeology timeline 1630s	Succeeded by 1640s in archaeology
