= 1763 in science =

List of years in science	(table)
- … 1753; 1754; 1755; 1756; 1757; 1758; 1759; 1760; 1761; 1762; 1763; 1764; 1765; 1766; 1767; 1768; 1769; 1770; 1771; 1772; 1773 …
- Art; Archaeology; Architecture; Literature; Music; Philosophy; Science; +...

The following events in the fields of science and technology occurred in the year 1763.

== Astronomy ==
- Publication posthumously of Nicolas Louis de Lacaille's Coelum australe stelliferum, cataloguing all his data from the southern hemisphere and including about 10,000 stars and a number of brighter star clusters and nebulae.
- Publication of Edward Stone's The whole doctrine of parallaxes explained and illustrated by an arithmetical and geometrical construction of the transit of Venus over the sun, June 6th, 1761. Enriched with a new and general method of determining the places where any transit of this planet, and especially that which will be June 3d, 1769, may be best observed.

== Mathematics ==
- December 23 – Thomas Bayes' solution to a problem of "inverse probability" is presented posthumously in his "Essay Towards Solving a Problem in the Doctrine of Chances" read by Richard Price to the Royal Society, containing a statement of a special case of Bayes' theorem.
- Euler's totient function is first published.

== Medicine ==
- Edward Stone publishes his discovery of the medicinal properties of salicylic acid.

== Awards ==
- Copley Medal: Not awarded

== Births ==
- January 31 (bapt.) – John Brinkley, English astronomer (died 1835)
- May 12 – John Bell, Scottish surgeon (died 1820)
- May 16 – Louis Nicolas Vauquelin, French chemist (died 1829)
- August 16 – Giovanni Battista Guglielmini, Bolognese physicist (died 1817)
- October 27 – William Maclure, Scottish American geologist (died 1840)
- December 25 – Claude Chappe, French engineer (died 1805)
- William Higgins, Irish chemist (died 1825)

== Deaths ==
- March 5 – William Smellie, Scottish obstetrician (born 1697)
- July 11 – Peter Forsskål, Swedish naturalist (born 1732)
