= 1653 in science =

List of years in science	(table)
- … 1643; 1644; 1645; 1646; 1647; 1648; 1649; 1650; 1651; 1652; 1653; 1654; 1655; 1656; 1657; 1658; 1659; 1660; 1661; 1662; 1663 …
- Art; Archaeology; Architecture; Literature; Music; Philosophy; Science; +...

The year 1653 in science and technology involved some significant events.

== Biology ==
- Jan van Kessel paints a series of pictures of insects and fruit.

== Mathematics ==
- Blaise Pascal publishes his Traité du triangle arithmétique in which he describes a convenient tabular presentation for binomial coefficients, now called Pascal's triangle.

== Physics ==
- Blaise Pascal publishes his Treatise on the Equilibrium of Liquids in which he explains his law of pressure.

== Births ==
- January 16 – Johann Conrad Brunner, Swiss anatomist (died 1727)
- March 24 – Joseph Sauveur, French mathematician and acoustician (died 1716)

== Deaths ==
- Jan Stampioen, Dutch mathematician (born 1610) (gunpowder explosion)
