= 1697 in science =

The year 1697 in science and technology involved some significant events.

== Technology ==
- August – Peter the Great, Tsar of Russia, studies shipbuilding and other technologies in Holland as part of his incognito Grand Embassy to western Europe.

== Organizations ==
- January – Bernard le Bovier de Fontenelle becomes perpetual secretary of the French Academy of Sciences, in succession to Jean-Baptiste du Hamel.

== Publications ==
- First known publication of English physician Richard Boulton, A Treatise of the Reason of Muscular Motion.
- William Dampier publishes A New Voyage Round the World in London.

== Births ==
- February 24 – Bernhard Siegfried Weiss, later known as Albinus, German-born Dutch anatomist (died 1770)
- February 5 – William Smellie, Scottish obstetrician (died 1763)
- September 23 – Andrew Plummer, Scottish physician and chemist (died 1756)

== Deaths ==
- January 26 – Georg Mohr, Danish mathematician (born 1640)
- March 1 – Francesco Redi, Tuscan physician and biologist (born 1626)
- June 12 – Ann Baynard, English natural philosopher (born 1672)
- Late October – Constantijn Huygens, Dutch statesman and telescope maker (born 1628)
- December 9 – Scipion Abeille, French surgeon and poet
- Probable year – Gilbert Clerke, English mathematician, natural philosopher and theologian (born 1626)
