= 1704 in science =

The year 1704 in science and technology involved some significant events.

== Astronomy ==
- approx. date – The first modern orrery is built by George Graham and Thomas Tompion.

== Earth sciences ==
- An earthquake strikes Gondar in Ethiopia.

== Meteorology ==
- Daniel Defoe documents the Great Storm of 1703 with eyewitness testimonies in The Storm (London).

== Physics ==
- Isaac Newton releases a record of experiments and the deductions made from them in Opticks, a major contribution in study of optics and refraction of light.
- Pierre Varignon invents the U-tube manometer, a device capable of measuring rarefaction in gases.

== Technology ==
- The second electric machine is invented by British engineer Francis Hauksbee the elder (1660–1713): it is a sphere of glass rotated by a wheel.
- For watch movements, Peter Debaufre invents the Debaufre escapement, the first frictional rest watch escapement produced: the escapement consists of two saw-tooth escape wheels of the same count.
- For watch bearings, a jewel bearing made of ruby, comprising a ring (the "hole") with a sink for oil, is invented by Nicholas Facio with Peter and Jacob Debaufre, who use pierced natural rubies. Other gemstones are used subsequently, including garnet (which is too soft) and diamond; in the 20th century, synthetic ruby or sapphire becomes universal for jewel bearings.
- In oil painting, colormaker Diesbach of Berlin (Germany) accidentally invents the pigment Prussian blue, a powerful dark blue pigment with greenish undertones (made from alum and animal bones); therefore, Prussian blue cannot be found in a paint layer predating this year.

== Publications ==
- John Harris publishes the first edition of the Lexicon Technicum, an encyclopedic dictionary of science, in London.

== Births ==
- February 28 – Louis Godin, French astronomer (died 1760)
- June 4 – Benjamin Huntsman, English inventor and manufacturer (died 1776)
- June 17 – John Kay, English inventor (died c. 1779)
- July 31 – Gabriel Cramer, Genevan mathematician (died 1752)
- September 3 – Joseph de Jussieu, French botanist (died 1779)
- December 29 – Martha Daniell Logan, American botanist (died 1779)
- (c. 1704) – William Battie, English psychiatrist (died 1776)
- undated – Richard Pococke, English anthropologist and explorer (died 1765)

== Deaths ==
- February 2 – Guillaume François Antoine, Marquis de l'Hôpital, French mathematician (born 1661)
- March 17 – Menno, Baron van Coehoorn, Dutch military engineer (born 1641)
- April 15 – Johann van Waveren Hudde, Dutch mathematician (born 1628)
- April 20 – Agnes Block, Dutch horticulturalist (born 1629)
- June 14 – Ralph Bathurst, English theologian, physician and academic (born 1620)
- July 7 – Pierre-Charles Le Sueur, French fur trader and explorer (born c. 1657)
- November 20 – Charles Plumier, French botanist (born 1646)
- Paolo Falconieri, Florentine polymath (born 1638)
