= 1651 in science =

List of years in science	(table)
- … 1641; 1642; 1643; 1644; 1645; 1646; 1647; 1648; 1649; 1650; 1651; 1652; 1653; 1654; 1655; 1656; 1657; 1658; 1659; 1660; 1661 …
- Art; Archaeology; Architecture; Literature; Music; Philosophy; Science; +...

The year 1651 in science and technology involved some significant events.

== Anatomy ==
- Jean Pecquet publishes Experimenta nova anatomica which includes his findings on the lymphatic system.
- William Harvey describes organ formation in the developing embryo in De Generatione.

== Astronomy ==
- William Gilbert's De Mundo Nostro Sublunari Philosophia Nova ("A New Philosophy of Our Sublunar World") is published posthumously. It theorises that the fixed stars are not all the same distance from Earth, and that the force of magnetism holds the planets in orbit around the Sun.
- Italian astronomer Giovanni Battista Riccioli's Almagestum Novum includes a map of the Moon giving definitive names to many features.

== Botany ==
- Begonias become known in Europe (although discovered by Father Francisco Hernández in Mexico before 1577).

== Chemistry ==
- German scientist Johann Glauber publishes Opera omnia chymica (Complete Works of Chemistry), a description of different techniques in chemistry.
- English physician John French publishes The Art of Distillation, the first detailed handbook in English on distillation.

== Medicine ==
- Noah Biggs publishes Matæotechnia medicinæ praxeōs, The vanity of the Craft of Physick, or, A new Dispensatory; wherein is dissected the errors, ignorance, impostures and supinities of the schools in their main pillars of purges, blood-letting, fontanels or issues, and diet, &c., and the particular medicines of the shops; with an humble motion for the reformation of the universities and the whole landscap of physick, and discovering the terra incognita of chymistrie to the Parliament of England.
- Nicholas Culpeper publishes his medical astrology treatise, Semiotica uranica, or, An Astrological Judgement of Diseases from the Decumbiture of the Sick.
- Jean Pecquet publishes Experimenta Nova Anatomica in Paris, including his discovery of the Cisterna chyli.

== Births ==
- January 20 – Edward Tyson, English comparative anatomist (died 1708)
- April 10 – Ehrenfried Walter von Tschirnhaus, German mathematician (died 1708)
- August 28 (bapt.) – Edmund Dummer, English naval engineer (died 1713)
- September 5 (bapt.) – William Dampier, English explorer and hydrographic surveyor, circumnavigates the world three times (died 1715)

== Deaths ==
- September – Arthur Dee, English physician and alchemist (born 1579)
- September 24 – Étienne Pascal, French mathematician (born 1588)
