= 1650 in science =

List of years in science	(table)
- … 1640; 1641; 1642; 1643; 1644; 1645; 1646; 1647; 1648; 1649; 1650; 1651; 1652; 1653; 1654; 1655; 1656; 1657; 1658; 1659; 1660 …
- Art; Archaeology; Architecture; Literature; Music; Philosophy; Science; +...

The year 1650 in science and technology involved some significant events.

== Astronomy ==
- In Ursa Major, the handle's middle star, Mizar, is noted to be a binary by Giambattista Riccioli.

== Botany ==
- William How publishes his flora Phytologia Britannica.
- Posthumous publication begins of Johann Bauhin's Historia plantarum universalis at Yverdon.

== Geology ==
- The Kolumbo underwater volcano in the Aegean Sea is discovered when it bursts from the sea and erupts, killing 70 people on a nearby island.

== Medicine ==
- English physician Francis Glisson publishes the first comprehensive pediatric text on rickets, De rachitide sive morbo puerili, qui vulgò The rickets dicitur, the result of collaborative research by members of the Royal College of Physicians.

== Technology ==
- Polish–Lithuanian nobleman Kazimierz Siemienowicz's widely translated manual Artis Magnae Artilleriae, pars prima ("Great Art of Artillery, the first part") is published in Amsterdam.

== Births ==
- November 28 - Jan Palfijn, Flemish surgeon and obstetrician (died 1730)
- May 1 (bapt.) - John Radcliffe, English physician (died 1714)
- approx. date – Thomas Savery, English engineer, inventor of a steam pump (died 1715)

== Deaths ==
- February 11 – René Descartes, French mathematician (born 1596)
- June 30 – Niccolò Cabeo, Italian polymath (born 1586)
- July 18 – Christoph Scheiner, German astronomer (born 1573)
- August – John Parkinson, English herbalist and botanist (born 1567)
- Giovanni Battista Zupi, Italian astronomer (born c. 1590)
- Philippe d'Aquin, French physician, hebraist, philologist and orientalist (born 1578)
