= 1792 in science =

The year 1792 in science and technology involved some significant events.

== Astronomy ==
- Franz Xaver, Baron Von Zach publishes The Tables of the Sun, an instrumental work for the advancement of navigation.
- The first Royal Astronomer of Ireland is appointed: the post is combined with the position of Director of the Dunsink Observatory in Dublin.

== Biology ==
- Scottish surgeon Robert Kerr publishes The Animal Kingdom, the first two volumes of an English translation of Linnaeus' Systema Naturae.

== Exploration and survey ==
- May — George Vancouver explores Puget Sound and becomes the first European to see Mount Rainier.
- May 11 — Robert Gray's Columbia River expedition: Captain Robert Gray on the Columbia Rediviva becomes the first white man to enter the Columbia River.
- The second great Ramsden theodolite constructed by Jesse Ramsden for the Principal Triangulation of Great Britain.

== History of science ==
- Kurt Sprengel publishes Versuch einer pragmatischen Geschichte der Arzneikunde in Halle, the first chronologically complete work on the history of medicine.

== Mathematics ==
- American statesmen Thomas Jefferson introduces the highest averages method of allocating electoral votes which becomes known as the D'Hondt method.

== Medicine ==
- Benjamin Rush campaigns for more humane treatment of psychiatric patients in Pennsylvania.
- François Chopart performs plastic surgery on a lip using a flap from the neck.

== Physics ==
- Abate Giovanni Battista Guglielmini publishes De diuturno terræ motu experimentis physico-mathematicis confirmato opusculum describing experiments carried out in Bologna to demonstrate rotation of the earth.

== Technology ==
- April 25 — First use of the guillotine.
- Claude Chappe successfully demonstrates the first semaphore line, between Paris and Lille, constituting an optical telegraph.
- William Murdoch invents gas lighting.
- George Anschutz constructs the first blast furnace in Pittsburgh, Pennsylvania.
- James Rumsey is granted a patent for a water turbine, in England.
- The first iron-cased Mysorean rockets are successfully developed and used by Hyder Ali and his son Tipu Sultan, rulers of the Kingdom of Mysore in India, against British East India Company forces during the Anglo-Mysore Wars.

== Awards ==
- Copley Medal: Benjamin Thompson

== Births ==
- January 12 — Johan August Arfwedson, Swedish chemist (died 1841)
- February 1 — Johann Friedrich Dieffenbach, German plastic surgeon (died 1847)
- February 17 — Karl Ernst von Baer, Estonian naturalist (died 1876)
- March 7 — John Herschel, English mathematician and astronomer (died 1871)
- May 21 — Gaspard-Gustave Coriolis, French mathematician, discoverer of the Coriolis effect (died 1843)
- July 7 — Diego de Argumosa, Spanish surgeon (died 1865)
- December 1 (November 20 Old Style) — Nikolai Lobachevsky, Russian mathematician and geometer (died 1856)

== Deaths ==
- March 1 – Jean Godin, French astronomer and naturalist (born 1713)
- March 10 — John Stuart, 3rd Earl of Bute, former Prime Minister of Great Britain and botanist (born 1713)
- October 28
  - Paul Möhring, German physician and botanist (born 1710)
  - John Smeaton, English civil engineer (born 1724)
