= 1713 in science =

The year 1713 in science and technology involved some significant events.

== Astronomy ==
- John Rowley of London produces an orrery to a commission by Charles Boyle, 4th Earl of Orrery.

== Mathematics ==
- September 9 – Nicolas Bernoulli first describes the St. Petersburg paradox in a letter to Pierre Raymond de Montmort.
- November 13 – James Waldegrave provides the first known minimax mixed strategy solution to a two-person game, in a letter to de Montmort.
- Jacob Bernoulli's best known work, Ars Conjectandi (The Art of Conjecture), is published posthumously by his nephew. It contains a mathematical proof of the law of large numbers, the Bernoulli numbers, and other important research in probability theory and enumeration.

== Medicine ==
- William Cheselden publishes Anatomy of the Human Body and it becomes a popular work on anatomy, at least in part due to it being written in English rather than Latin.
- Italian Bernardino Ramazzini provides one of the first descriptions of task-specific dystonia in his book of occupational diseases, Morbis Artificum, noting in chapter II of its Supplementum that "Scribes and Notaries" may develop "incessant movement of the hand, always in the same direction ... the continuous and almost tonic strain on the muscles... that results in failure of power in the right hand".

== Physics ==
- The second edition of Isaac Newton's Principia Mathematica is published with an introduction by Roger Cotes and an essay by Newton titled General Scholium where he famously states "Hypotheses non fingo" ("I feign no hypotheses").

== Technology ==
- (c. 1713) Daniel Gabriel Fahrenheit switches from using alcohol to mercury as the thermometric fluid in his thermometers, creating the first mercury-in-glass thermometer.
- Andrew Robinson builds the first ship called a schooner in Gloucester, Massachusetts.

== Births ==
- January 5 – Jorge Juan y Santacilia, Spanish naval officer, mathematician, scientist, astronomer and engineer (died 1773)
- March 15 – Nicolas Louis de Lacaille, French astronomer (baptized December 28; died 1762)
- May 3 – Alexis Claude Clairaut, French mathematician (died 1765)
- May 25 – John Stuart, Lord Mount Stuart, Scottish politician and botanist (died 1792)
- July 5 – Jean Godin, French astronomer and naturalist (died 1792)
- September 10 – John Needham, English biologist (died 1781)
- Anthony Addington, English physician (died 1790)
- Jean Paul de Gua de Malves, French mathematician (died 1785)

== Deaths ==
- April 29 (bur.) – Francis Hauksbee, English scientific instrument maker and experimentalist (born 1660)
- April (end) – Edmund Dummer, English naval engineer (born 1651)
- July 7 – Henry Compton, English bishop and botanist (born 1632)
- August 26 (bur.) – Denis Papin, French-born physicist, mathematician and inventor (born 1647)
- October 20 – Archibald Pitcairne, Scottish physician (born 1652)
