= 1694 in science =

The year 1694 in science and technology involved some significant events.

== Botany ==
- Joseph Pitton de Tournefort publishes Éléments de botanique ou méthode pour reconnaître les plantes.
- Rudolf Jakob Camerarius publishes De Sexu Plantarum Epistola in which he demonstrates the role of stamens and pistils in plant reproduction.

== Births ==
- June 26 – Georg Brandt, Swedish chemist (died 1768)

== Deaths ==
- November 29 – Marcello Malpighi, Italian physiologist (born 1628)
