= 1825 in science =

The year 1825 science and technology involved some significant events, listed below.

== Astronomy ==
- Pierre-Simon Laplace completes his study of gravitation, the stability of the Solar System, tides, the precession of the equinoxes, the libration of the Moon, and Saturn's rings in publishing the fifth and final volume of Mécanique Céleste (Celestial Mechanics).

== Biology ==
- Richard Harlan publishes Fauna Americana.
- Charles Waterton publishes Wanderings in South America, the North-west of the United States, and the Antilles, in the years 1812, 1816, 1820, and 1824; with original instructions for the perfect preservation of birds, &c. for cabinets of natural history.
- Cox's Orange Pippin apple cultivar first grown, at Colnbrook in Buckinghamshire, England, by horticulturist and retired brewer Richard Cox.

== Chemistry ==
- Michael Faraday isolates benzene as Bicarburet of Hydrogen.
- Hans Christian Ørsted reduces aluminium chloride to produce metallic aluminium in an impure form.
- Friedrich Wöhler and Justus von Liebig perform the first confirmed discovery and explanation of isomers, earlier named by Berzelius. Working with cyanic acid and fulminic acid, they correctly deduce that isomerism is caused by differing arrangements of atoms within a molecular structure.

== Earth sciences ==
- July – Volcanic eruption of Mount Guntur in West Java.
- G. Poulett Scrope publishes Considerations on Volcanoes, the first systematic work on volcanology.

== Mathematics ==
- Augustin-Louis Cauchy presents the Cauchy integral theorem for general integration paths—he assumes the function being integrated has a continuous derivative.
- Augustin-Louis Cauchy introduces the theory of residues in complex analysis.
- Peter Gustav Lejeune Dirichlet and Adrien-Marie Legendre prove Fermat's Last Theorem for n = 5.
- André-Marie Ampère discovers Stokes' theorem.
- Benjamin Gompertz formulates the Gompertz function.

== Medicine ==
- Jean-Baptiste Sarlandière's Mémoires sur L'Électro-Puncture introduces Western medicine to electroacupuncture.

== Paleontology ==
- Georges Cuvier proposes his catastrophe theory as the cause of extinctions of large groups of animals.
- Étienne Geoffroy Saint-Hilaire identifies Cuvier's fossil 'crocodile' as a teleosaurus.

== Technology ==
- March – Richard Roberts patents the self-acting spinning mule in England.
- August – The wire-cable suspension bridge between Tournon-sur-Rhône and Tain-l'Hermitage, designed by Marc Seguin, opens.
- September 27 – The world's longest railway to be worked by steam locomotives at this date, the Stockton and Darlington Railway, opens in northern England.
- October 26 – The Erie Canal officially opens over 363 miles (584 km) from Albany, New York, to Lake Erie.
- English inventor William Sturgeon describes the first electromagnet.

== Institutions ==
- December 19 – First of the annual Royal Institution Christmas Lectures in London, which will continue for two centuries.

== Awards ==
- Copley Medal: François Arago; Peter Barlow

== Births ==
- January 18 – Edward Frankland (died 1899), English chemist.
- March 25 – Max Schultze (died 1874), German physiologist.
- March 30 – Theodor Kjerulf (died 1888), Norwegian geologist.
- May 1 – Johann Balmer (died 1898), Swiss mathematician.
- May 4 – Thomas Henry Huxley (died 1895), English biologist.
- May 9 – George Davidson (died 1911), English-born geodesist, astronomer, geographer, surveyor and engineer in the United States.
- June 6 – Friedrich Bayer (died 1880), German manufacturing chemist.
- September 4 – Richard Maack (died 1886), Russian naturalist, geographer, and anthropologist.
- November 29 – Jean-Martin Charcot (died 1893), French neurologist.
- December 26 – Felix Hoppe-Seyler (died 1895), German physiologist.

== Deaths ==
- April 19 – Marc-Auguste Pictet (born 1752), Swiss scientific journalist and natural philosopher.
- June – William Higgins (born 1763), Irish chemist.
- July 25 – John Gough (born 1757), blind English natural philosopher.
- October 6 – Bernard Germain Étienne (born 1756), French naturalist.
- Maria Angela Ardinghelli (born 1730), Italian mathematician and physicist.
- John Templeton (born 1766), "father of Irish botany".
