= 1752 in science =

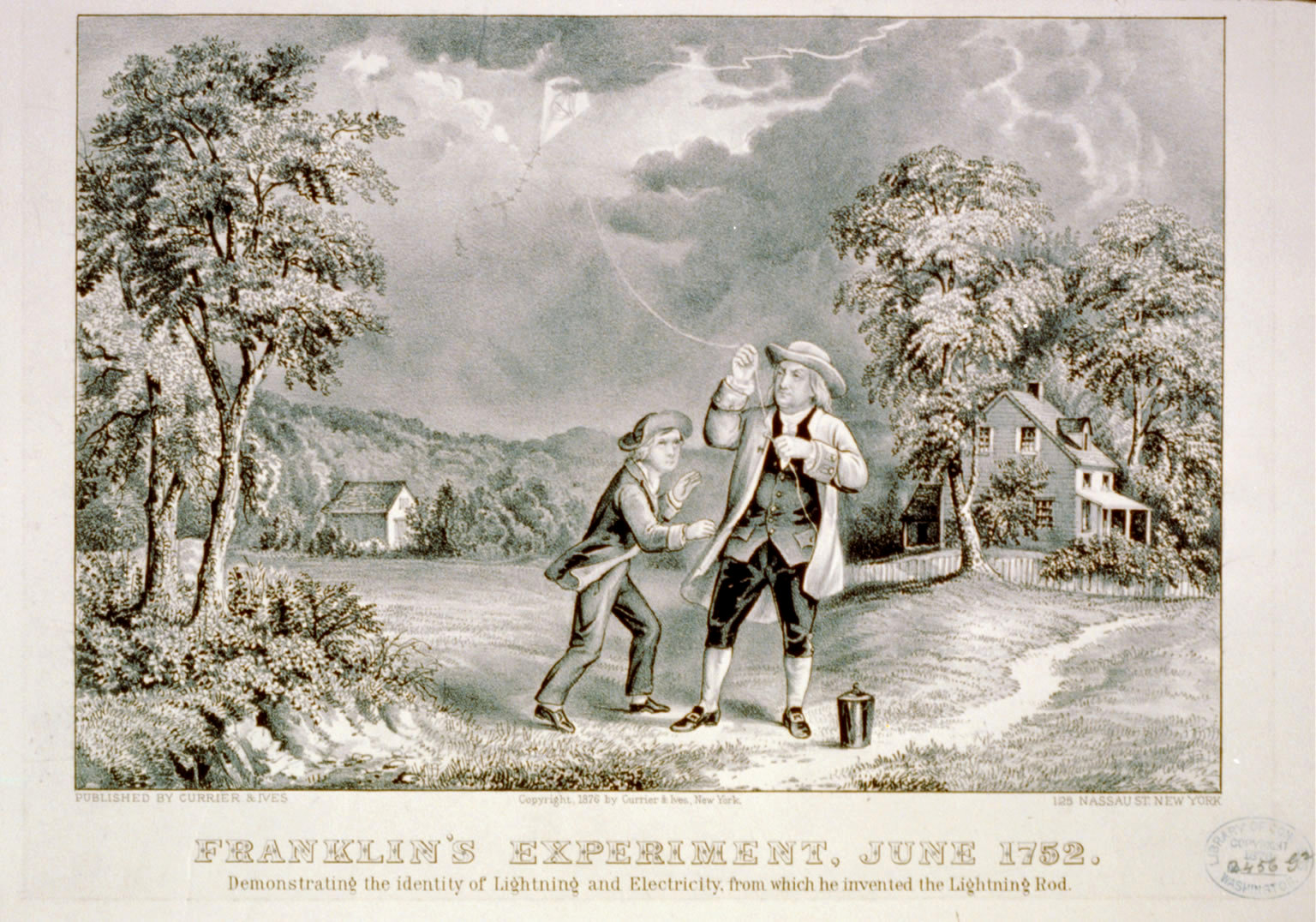
Benjamin Franklin Lightning Experiment, 1752

The year 1752 in science and technology involved some significant events.

== Biology ==
- Establishment of Tiergarten Schönbrunn in Vienna, the world's oldest zoo.

== Chemistry ==
- Thomas Melvill delivers a lecture entitled Observations on light and colours to the Medical Society of Edinburgh, a precursor of flame emission spectroscopy.
- Dmitry Ivanovich Vinogradov and Mikhail Lomonosov advertise the first hard-paste porcelain to be produced in Russia.

== Mathematics ==
- Euler gives his formula for the number of faces, edges and vertices in a polyhedron.

== Medicine ==
- Foundation of what will become the Manchester Royal Infirmary as a cottage hospital in Garden Street, Manchester, England, by Charles White (surgeon).
- John Pringle publishes Observations on the Diseases of the Army in Camp and Garrison in London, a pioneering text in modern military medicine.
- Approximate date – James Ayscough begins experimenting with tinted lenses in spectacles.

== Physics ==
- Benjamin Franklin's kite experiment determines that lightning is an electrical phenomenon.

== Awards ==
- Copley Medal: John Pringle

== Births ==
- May 9 – Antonio Scarpa, Italian anatomist (died 1832)
- May 11 – Johann Friedrich Blumenbach, German physiologist and anthropologist (died 1840)
- July 6 – John Sheldon, English anatomist (died 1808)
- July 7 – Joseph Marie Jacquard, French inventor (died 1834)
- July 23 – Marc-Auguste Pictet, Swiss physicist (died 1825)
- September 18 – Adrien-Marie Legendre, French mathematician (died 1833)
- Pierre Joseph Bonnaterre, French naturalist (died 1804)

== Deaths ==
- January 4 – Gabriel Cramer, Genevan mathematician (born 1704)
- February 9 – Frederik Hasselquist, Swedish traveller and naturalist (born 1722)
- April 10 – William Cheselden, surgeon (born 1688)
