= 1695 in science =

Christiaan Huygens

The year 1695 in science and technology involved some significant events.

== Technology ==
- English clockmaker Samuel Watson produces the "Physicians pulse watch", the first watch with a lever that stops the second hand, i.e. a stopwatch.

== Events ==
- Gottfried Leibniz publishes his "New System of the Nature and Communication of Substances".
- Denis Papin moves from Marburg to Kassel and publishes Recueil de diverses pièces touchant quelques machines.

== Births ==
- February 2 – William Borlase, Cornish naturalist (died 1772)
- February 6 – Nicolaus II Bernoulli, Swiss mathematician (died 1726)
- May 3 – Henri Pitot, Italian-born French engineer (died 1771)
- August 4 – William Oliver, Cornish-born English physician (died 1764)
- November 10 – John Bevis, English physician and astronomer (died 1771)

== Deaths ==
- January 26 - Johann Jakob Wepfer, Swiss pathologist and pharmacologist (born 1620)
- July 8 – Christiaan Huygens, Dutch mathematician and physicist (born 1629)
- December 30 – Samuel Morland, English inventor (born 1625)
