= 1724 in science =

The year 1724 in science and technology involved some significant events.

== Astronomy ==
- May 22 – Giacomo F. Maraldi concludes, from his observations during an eclipse, that the corona is part of the Sun.

== Mathematics ==
- Daniel Bernoulli expresses the numbers of the Fibonacci sequence in terms of the golden ratio.
- Isaac Watts publishes Logic, or The Right Use of Reason in the Enquiry After Truth With a Variety of Rules to Guard Against Error in the Affairs of Religion and Human Life, as well as in the Sciences.

== Medicine ==
- Herman Boerhaave describes Boerhaave syndrome, a fatal tearing of the esophagus.

== Institutions ==
- January 28 – The Saint Petersburg Academy of Sciences is founded by Peter I of Russia.

== Births ==
- March 27 – Jane Colden, American botanist (died 1766)
- June 8 – John Smeaton, English civil engineer (died 1792)
- July 10 – Eva Ekeblad, Swedish agronomist, first woman in the Swedish Royal Academy of Science (died 1786)
- September 27 – Anton Friedrich Busching, German geographer (died 1793)
- December 25 – John Michell, English scientist (died 1793)
- Date unknown – Marie Anne Victoire Pigeon, French mathematician (died 1767)

== Deaths ==
- October 18 – Jean de Hautefeuille, French inventor (born 1647)
