= 1640s in archaeology =

List of years in archaeology	(table)
- … 1630; 1631; 1632; 1633; 1634; 1635; 1636; 1637; 1638; 1639; 1640; 1641; 1642; 1643; 1644; 1645; 1646; 1647; 1648; 1649; 1650 …
- In science 1637 1638 1639 1640 1641 1642 1643
- Art; Archaeology; Architecture; Literature; Music; Philosophy; Science; +...

The decade of the 1640s in archaeology involved some significant events.

== Explorations ==
- 1649: John Aubrey describes the megaliths at Avebury, England.

== Publications ==
- 1643: Athanasius Kircher, Lingua Aegyptiaca Restituta.
- 1646: John Greaves, Pyramidographia, or a Description of the Pyramids in Ægypt.

== Births ==
- 1646: April 4 - Antoine Galland (d. 1715).
- 1647: Jacques Spon, French doctor and archaeologist (d. 1685).

== Deaths ==
Preceded by 1630s in archaeology	Archaeology timeline 1640s	Succeeded by 1650s in archaeology
