= 1710 in science =

The year 1710 in science and technology involved some significant events.

== Events ==
- The Royal Society of Sciences in Uppsala is founded in Uppsala, Sweden, as the Collegium curiosorum ("College of the Curious").

== Astronomy ==
- Edmond Halley, comparing his observations with Ptolemy's catalog, discovers the proper motion of some "fixed" stars.

== Physiology and medicine ==
- Alexis Littré, in his treatise Diverses observations anatomiques, is the first physician to suggest the possibility of performing a lumbar colostomy for an obstruction of the colon.
- Stephen Hales makes the first experimental measurement of the capacity of a mammalian heart.

== Technology ==
- Jakob Christof Le Blon invents a three-color printing process with red, blue, and yellow ink. Years later he adds black introducing the earliest four-color printing process.

== Zoology ==
- René Antoine Ferchault de Réaumur produces a paper on the use of spiders to produce silk.

== Publications ==
- John Arbuthnot publishes "An argument for Divine Providence, taken from the constant regularity observed in the births of both sexes" in Philosophical Transactions of the Royal Society of London.

== Births ==
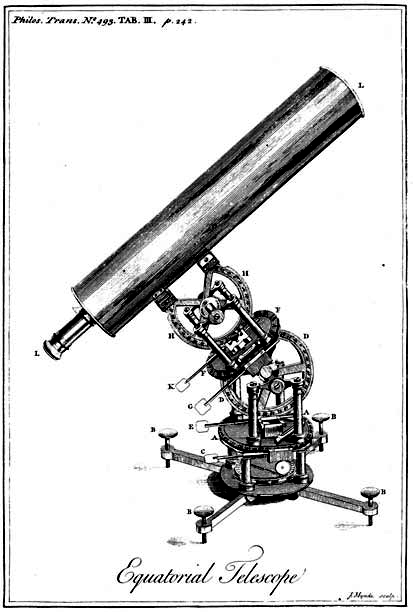
James Short's telescope

- April 15 – William Cullen, Scottish physician and chemist (died 1790)
- April 25 – James Ferguson, Scottish astronomer (died 1776)
- May 18 – Johann II Bernoulli, Swiss mathematician (died 1790)
- June 10 – James Short, Scottish mathematician and optician (died 1768)
- July 21 – Paul Möhring, German physician and zoologist (died 1792)
- August 13 – William Heberden, English physician who gives the first description of angina pectoris (died 1801)
- August 20 – Thomas Simpson, English mathematician (died 1761)
- September 3 – Abraham Trembley, Genevan naturalist (died 1784)

== Deaths ==
- February 25 – Daniel Greysolon, Sieur du Lhut, French explorer (born c. 1639)
- July 25 – Gottfried Kirch, German astronomer (born 1639)
- September 23 – Ole Rømer, Danish astronomer (born 1644)
- Jean de Fontaney, French Jesuit mathematician and astronomer (born 1643)
