= 1756 in science =

The year 1756 in science and technology involved some significant events.

== Chemistry ==
- Joseph Black describes how carbonates become more alkaline when they lose carbon dioxide, whereas the taking-up of carbon dioxide reconverts them.
- Scottish physician Francis Home publishes Experiments on Bleaching in Edinburgh.
- Mikhail Lomonosov disproves the phlogiston theory of combustion and pioneers the study of oxidation by converting tin to stannic oxide.

== History of science ==
- Thomas Birch begins publication of The History of the Royal Society of London.

== Technology ==
- John Smeaton produces the first high-quality cement using hydraulic lime since Roman times for construction of the third Eddystone Lighthouse (completed 1759, following burning down of the second in 1755).
- The recipe for mayonnaise (originally "salsa mahonesa" or "maonesa") is probably brought back to France by his chef after Louis François Armand du Plessis, duc de Richelieu's military success on Menorca.

== Physiology and medicine ==
- John Lining published one of the first clinical descriptions of yellow fever in the American South.

== Awards ==
- Copley Medal: Not awarded

== Births ==
- June 4 – Jean-Antoine Chaptal, French chemist who names nitrogen in 1790 (died 1832)
- September 21 – John Loudon McAdam, Scottish highway engineer (died 1836)
- November 30 – Ernst Chladni, German physicist (died 1827)
- December 26 – Bernard-Germain-Étienne de La Ville-sur-Illon, French naturalist (died 1825)
- David Friesenhausen, German-Hungarian-Jewish rabbi, mathematician and astronomer (died 1828)

== Deaths ==
- February 22 – Pehr Löfling, Swedish Linnean botanist, (born 1729)
- April 16
  - Jacques Cassini, French astronomer (born 1677)
  - Andrew Plummer, Scottish physician and chemist (born 1697)
