= Jan Jansz de Jonge Stampioen =

Dutch mathematician (1610–1653)

Jan Jansz de Jonge Stampioen (1610, Rotterdam - 1653, The Hague) was a Dutch mathematician famous for his published work on spherical trigonometry. In 1638 he moved to The Hague to become tutor of William II, Prince of Orange. In 1644 he was employed to tutor Christiaan Huygens in mathematics.
