= 1620s in archaeology =

List of years in archaeology	(table)
- … 1610; 1611; 1612; 1613; 1614; 1615; 1616; 1617; 1618; 1619; 1620; 1621; 1622; 1623; 1624; 1625; 1626; 1627; 1628; 1629; 1630 …
- In science 1617 1618 1619 1620 1621 1622 1623
- Art; Archaeology; Architecture; Literature; Music; Philosophy; Science; +...

The decade of the 1620s in archaeology involved some significant events.

== Finds ==
- 1621: Ludovisi Battle sarcophagus in Rome.
- 1627: Parian Chronicle in Paros.

== Events ==
- 1625: Last cannon salvaged from English ship Revenge (sank following Battle of Flores (1591))

== Births ==
- 1620: 15 February - François Charpentier, French archaeologist (d. 1702)
- 1626: 12 March - John Aubrey, English antiquary (d. 1697)

== Deaths ==
- 1629: Antonio Bosio, Italian scholar (b. 1575/1576)

Preceded by 1610s in archaeology	Archaeology timeline 1620s	Succeeded by 1630s in archaeology
