= 1762 in science =

The year 1762 in science and technology involved some significant events.

== Biology ==
- Charles Bonnet's Considerations sur les corps organisées is published in Amsterdam, synthesising current knowledge of cell biology and presenting his theory of palingenesis, intended to refute the theory of epigenesis.
- Courses begin at the first veterinary school, established by Claude Bourgelat in Lyon.

== Mathematics ==
- September – Society for Equitable Assurances on Lives and Survivorships is established in London, pioneering mutual insurance using a method of actuarial science devised by mathematician James Dodson.
- Joseph-Louis Lagrange discovers the divergence theorem.

== Pharmacology ==
- Antoine Baumé publishes his textbook Éléments de pharmacie théorique et pratique in Paris.

== Physics ==
- Joseph Black first makes known his discoveries on latent heat, in Glasgow.

== Awards ==
- Copley Medal: Not awarded

== Births ==
- April 10 – Giovanni Aldini, Italian physicist (died 1834)
- November 20 – Pierre André Latreille, French zoologist (died 1833)

== Deaths ==
- February 20 – Tobias Mayer, German astronomer (born 1723)
- March 21 – Nicolas Louis de Lacaille, French astronomer (born 1713)
- June 13 – Dorothea Erxleben, German physician (born 1715)
- July 10 – Jan Frederik Gronovius, Dutch botanist (born 1690)
- July 13 – James Bradley, English Astronomer Royal (born 1693)
- July 30 – William Braikenridge, English clergyman and geometer (born 1700)
