= St John's College Old Library, Cambridge =

1628 building in Cambridge, England

Coordinates: 52.20853°N 0.11627°E

St John's College Old Library
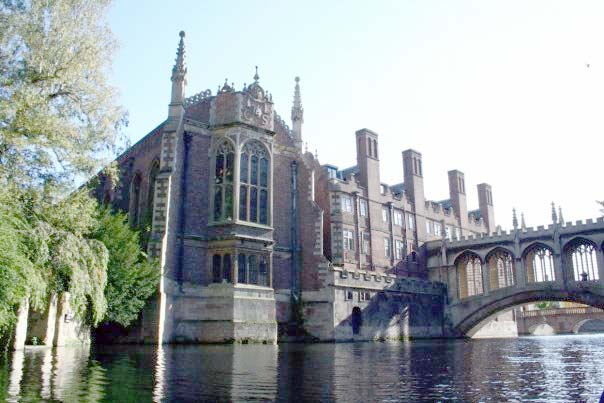
- The Old Library seen from the River Cam
- Location: Cambridge, United Kingdom
- Type: Academic library
- Established: 1628 (398 years ago)

Access and use
- Access requirements: Open on occasion to College members and their guests, and for public exhibitions.

Other information
- Website: The Old Library website

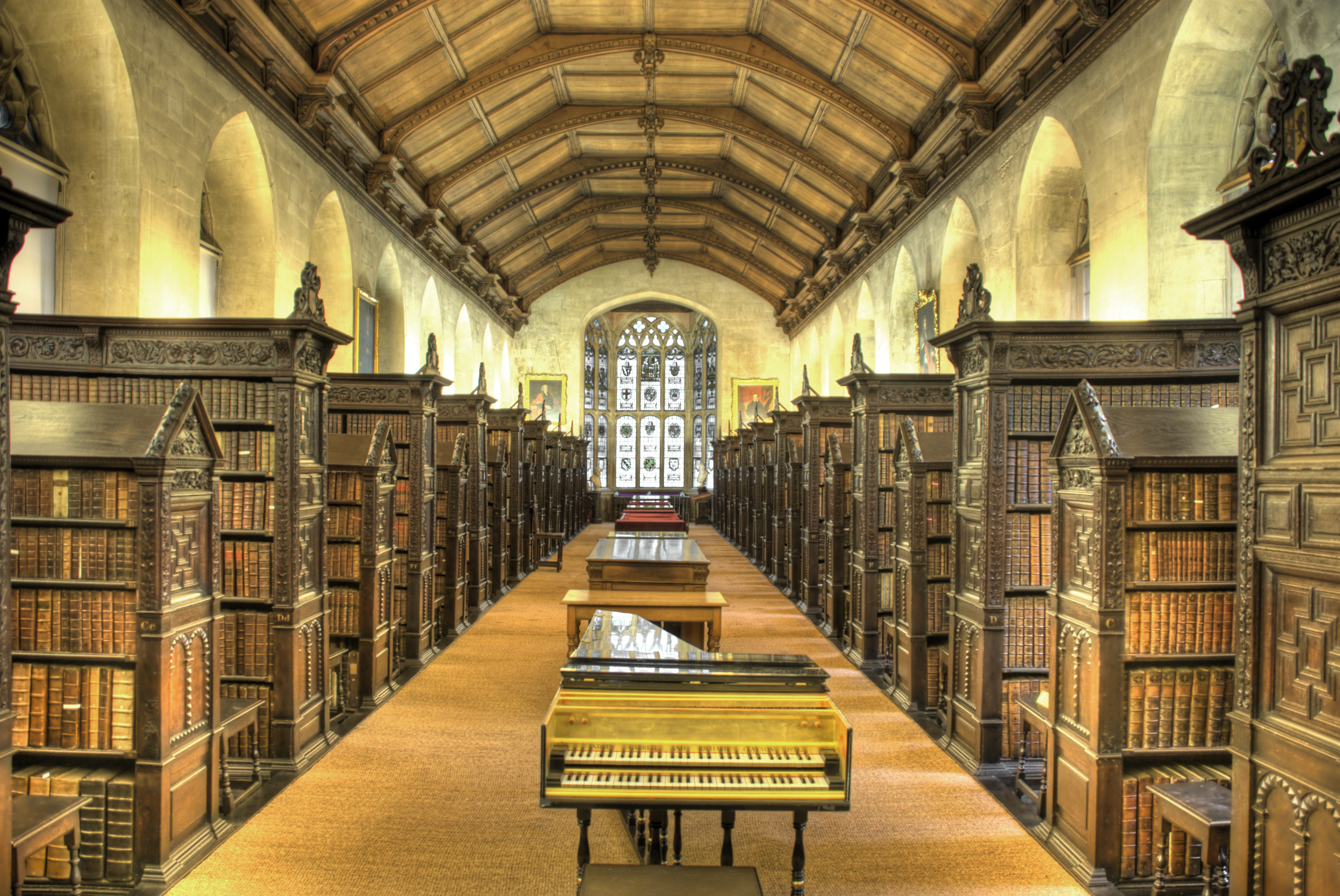
Interior of the library

The Old Library of St John's College, Cambridge connects to Third Court, and was built between 1623 and 1628, largely through the donations and efforts of two members of the College, Valentine Carey, Bishop of Exeter and John Williams, Lord-Keeper and Bishop of Lincoln.

== History ==
When the College first opened in 1516, its Library was situated in what was then the College's only court, First Court. It occupied the first floor to the south of the Great Gate. Just over 100 years later, the Master of St John's received notification from Bishop Carey that Bishop John Williams, while not wishing to 'be counted the builder or founder' of a new library, was prepared to be a 'contributor towardes it'.

The building's shell was completed in 1624, a date which appears on the south gable of the western oriel window. The building is constructed in the Jacobean Gothic style, and measures 110 feet by 30 feet wide. The tall two-light windows are a very early example of Gothic Revival, but the façade is Renaissance-inspired. The library contains 42 bookcases arranged at right angles to the north and south walls.

== Visiting ==
The Old Library is no longer used as a working space, but opens during specific periods to College members and their guests, and for occasional public exhibitions. Researchers can make appointments to consult items from the Library's collections.
