= 1693 in science =

The year 1693 in science and technology involved some significant events.

== Actuarial science ==
- Edmond Halley publishes an article in Philosophical Transactions of the Royal Society on life annuities featuring a life table constructed on the basis of statistics from Breslau provided by Caspar Neumann.

== Botany ==
- Publication of Charles Plumier's first work, Description des plantes de l'Amérique, in Paris, principally devoted to ferns.

== Mathematics ==
- Bernard Frénicle de Bessy's Des quarrez ou tables magiques, a treatise on magic squares, is published posthumously, describing all 880 essentially different normal magic squares of order 4.

== Physiology and medicine ==
- Flemish anatomist Philip Verheyen, in his widely used text Corporis Humani Anatomia, is the first to record the name of the Achilles tendon.

== Births ==
- March – James Bradley, Astronomer Royal (died 1762)

== Deaths ==
- February 18 – Elias Tillandz, Swedish physician and botanist in Finland (born 1640)
- October 4 – Sir Thomas Clayton, English physician, academic and politician (born c.1612)
- December 22 – Elisabeth Hevelius, Danzig astronomer (born 1647)
