= Jean-Baptiste Sarlandière =

French anatomist and physiologist

Jean-Baptiste Sarlandière (9 May 1787 – 25 July 1838) was a French anatomist and physiologist born in Aix-la-Chapelle.

At the age of 16 he began his medical studies at the local hospital in Noirmoutiers, but was soon called to military service, spending the next eleven years as part of the French Army (1803–1814). In 1814 he resumed his studies, and subsequently was appointed physician at the military hospital in Paris. He received his medical degree in 1815 with a thesis titled Effets des cosmétiques chez les dames. In Paris, Sarlandière became a friend and assistant to François Magendie (1783–1855), with whom he collaborated on several physiological experiments.

Sarlandière is remembered for introducing electroacupuncture to European medicine, a therapeutic technique that combined electricity with acupuncture. Unlike Oriental acupuncture, the needle was not the primary agent of treatment, but simply acted as a conductor to apply the electricity subcutaneously. Reportedly he had success with electroacupuncture in treating respiratory and rheumatic disorders, as well as some forms of paralysis. His technique was soon adopted in French hospitals.

In 1817 he invented a "bdellomètre", a mechanical blood pump designed to produce a controlled release of blood from the body. The device was to be used as a replacement for leeches in medical bloodletting.

== Selected writings ==
Among his written works was the unfinished Traité du système nerveux (Treatise on the nervous system). Other noteworthy writings of his are:

- Memoires sur l’electropuncture (1825) - treatise on electroacupuncture.
- Anatomie méthodique, ou Organographie humaine (1830) - Systematized anatomy, or human organography.
- Physiologie de l’action musculaire appliquée aux arts d’imitation - Physiology of muscular action, etc.
