= Marquard Gude =

German archaeologist

- Born: 1 February 1635; Rendsburg, Holstein, Germany
- Died: 26 November 1689 (aged 54)
- Other names: Marquard Gude (Gudius)
- Occupations: archaeologist, classical scholar
- Known for: Greek and Latin inscriptions

Marquard Gude (Gudius) (1 February 1635 – 26 November 1689) was a German archaeologist and classical scholar, most famous for his collection of Greek and Latin inscriptions.

He was born at Rendsburg in Holstein, Germany. He was originally intended for the law, but from an early age showed a decided preference for classical studies. In 1658 he went to the Netherlands in the hope of finding work as a teacher of classics, and in the following year, through the influence of JF Gronovius, he obtained the post of tutor and travelling companion to a wealthy young Dutchman, Samuel Schars.

During his travels Gude seized the opportunity of copying inscriptions and manuscripts. At the earnest request of his pupil, who had become greatly attached to him, Gude refused more than one professional appointment, and it was not until 1671 that he accepted the post of librarian to Duke Christian Albert of Holstein-Gottorp.

Schars, who had accompanied Gude, died in 1675, and left him the greater part of his property. In 1678 Gude, having quarrelled with the duke, retired into private life; but in 1682 he entered the service of Christian V of Denmark as counsellor of the Schleswig-Holstein chancellery, and remained in it almost to the time of his death.

Gude's great life-work, the collection of Greek and Latin inscriptions, was not published until 1731. Mention may also be made of his first edition (editio princeps) (1661) of the treatise of Hippolytus the Martyr on Antichrist, and of his notes on Phaedrus (with four new fables discovered by him) published in Pieter Burmann's edition (1698). His correspondence (ed. P Burmann, 1697) is the most important authority for the events of Gude's life, besides containing valuable information on the learning of the times. See also J Möller, Cimbria literates, iii., and Conrad Bursian in Allgemeine deutsche Biographie, x.

The "monumental collection of medieval and Renaissance codices in Latin and Greek of Gude's library" which is probably "most important 17th-century private collection of manuscripts north of the Alps" is today in the ducal library, Herzog August Bibliothek (HAB), in Wolfenbüttel. It is fortunate that the manuscripts in this collection were not dispersed after Gude's death but instead were brought to the HAB by the librarian Gottfried Wilhelm Leibniz.
