= 1690 in science =

The year 1690 in science and technology involved some significant events.

== Astronomy ==
- Giovanni Cassini observes differential rotation within Jupiter's atmosphere.
- December – Earliest recorded sightings of the planet Uranus, by John Flamsteed, who mistakenly catalogues it as the star 34 Tauri.

== Geography ==
- Franciscan Vincenzo Coronelli publishes the first folio of his atlas Atlante Veneto.

== Botany ==
- French horticulturalist Jean-Baptiste de La Quintinie's Instruction pour les jardins fruitiers et potagers is published posthumously.

== Mathematics ==
- Izeki Tomotoki (井関 知辰) of Osaka publishes Sampo-Hakki (算法発揮), in which he gives the resultant and the Laplace expansion of the determinant for the n×n case. At about this date, Tanaka Yoshizane (田中 由真) also describes and applies the resultant, in Sampo-Funkai (算法紛解).
- Michel Rolle publishes Traité d'Algebre, in which he gives the first published description in Europe of Gaussian elimination.

== Medicine ==
- Justine Siegemund publishes Die Chur-Brandenburgische Hof-Wehemutter ("The Court Midwife"), the first medical textbook in German written by a woman.

== Technology ==
- February 3 – America's first paper money is printed in the Massachusetts Bay Colony.
- A rudimentary working model of a liquid compass is introduced by Sir Edmond Halley at a meeting of the Royal Society.
- French physicist Denis Papin, while in Leipzig and having observed the mechanical power of atmospheric pressure on his 'digester', builds a working model of a reciprocating steam engine for pumping water, the first of its kind, though not efficient.

== Births ==
- March 18 – Christian Goldbach, Prussian mathematician (died 1764)

== Deaths ==
- February 3 – Elizabeth Walker, English pharmacist (born 1623)
- October 13 – Ole Borch, Danish polymath (born 1626)
- October 22 (bur.) – William Ball, English astronomer (born c. 1631)
