= 1691 in science =

The year 1691 in science and technology involved some significant events.

== Biology ==
- Italian Jesuit scholar Filippo Bonanni publishes the results of his microscopic observations of invertebrates in Observationes circa Viventia, quae in Rebus non-Viventibus.

== Mathematics ==
- Gottfried Leibniz discovers the technique of separation of variables for ordinary differential equations.
- Michel Rolle invents Rolle's theorem.

== Medicine ==
- Anton Nuck's Adenographia curiosa et uteri foeminei anatome nova is published at Leiden, including a description of the canal of Nuck and a demonstration that the embryo is derived from the ovary and not the sperm.

== Technology ==
- Edmond Halley devises a diving bell.
- In music, the "equal temperament scale" used in modern music is developed by organist Andreas Werckmeister.

== Births ==
- November 18 – Mårten Triewald, Swedish mechanical engineer (died 1747)

== Deaths ==
- January 17 – Richard Lower, English physician who performed the first direct blood transfusion (born 1631)
- December 31 – Robert Boyle, Anglo-Irish chemist (born 1627)
