= Elias Tillandz =

Elias Tillandz (1640–1693; born Tillander) was a Swedish medical doctor and botanist who worked in Finland. He was the professor of medicine at the Academy of Turku. He wrote the country's first botanical work, the Catalogus Plantarum, which was first published in 1673. As a doctor he also prepared medicines for his patients by using his extensive knowledge of plants.

According to legend, Tillandz (Till lands means by land in Swedish) changed his name from Tillander to Tillandz when, as a student, he travelled by boat from Turku to Stockholm. On the way, he became so seasick that he returned by walking around the Gulf of Bothnia, a distance of some 1000 kilometers.

A genus of epiphytic plants, Tillandsia, was named after Tillandz by Carl Linnaeus.

This botanist is denoted by the author abbreviation Tillandz when citing a botanical name.
