= 1757 in science =

The year 1757 in science and technology involved some significant events.

== Astronomy ==
- April 16 – The works of astronomer Galileo Galilei espousing heliocentrism are removed (with the approval of Pope Benedict XIV) from the Index Librorum Prohibitorum list of books banned by Roman Catholic Church, along with "all books teaching the earth's motion and the sun's immobility". Other works of heliocentrists Galileo, Nicolaus Copernicus, Johannes Kepler, Diego de Zúñiga and Paolo Foscarini remain on the list.
- Nicolas Louis de Lacaille publishes his Astronomiae Fundamenta Novissimus, containing a standard catalogue of 398 bright stars with positions corrected for aberration and nutation.
- Tobias Mayer presents accurate tables of the Moon's motion to the Board of Longitude in Great Britain.

== Chemistry ==
- Scottish physician Francis Home publishes The Principles of Agriculture and Vegetation, an early presentation of the chemical principles underlying plant nutrition, in Edinburgh.

== Medicine ==
- March 30 – Founding of the Rigshospitalet, national hospital of Denmark, in Copenhagen.
- December 8 – Opening of the "New Lying-In" or Rotunda Hospital in Dublin, designed by Richard Cassels.
- Albrecht von Haller begins publication of Elementa physiologiae corporis humani in Switzerland.

== Physics ==
- Leonhard Euler publishes his equations for inviscid flow.

== Technology ==
- London instrument maker John Bird makes the first navigational sextant.
- Benjamin Franklin invents a three-wheel clock movement, which later leads to several variants in the design of pendulum clocks.
- The Grubenmann brothers complete timber arch bridges in Switzerland which include the longest vehicular bridge spans extant at this date:
  - Crossing the Rhine at Schaffhausen in two spans of 52 m and 59 m (by Hans Ulrich)
  - A single-span of 67 m at Reichenau (by Johannes)

== Awards ==
- Copley Medal: Lord Charles Cavendish

== Births ==
- January 17 – John Gough, English natural philosopher (died 1825)
- May 24 – William Charles Wells, Scottish American physician (died 1817)
- June 22 – George Vancouver, English explorer (died 1798)
- July 11 – Johann Matthäus Bechstein, German naturalist (died 1822)
- August 9 – Thomas Telford, Scottish civil engineer (died 1834)
- November 12 – Robert Willan, English dermatologist (died 1812)
- date unknown - Agnes Ibbetson, English plant physiologist (died 1823)

== Deaths ==
- January 9
  - Louis Bertrand Castel, French Jesuit mathematician and physicist (born 1688)
  - Bernard le Bovier de Fontenelle, French scientific populariser (born 1657)
- August 28 – David Hartley, English physician and psychologist (born 1705)
- October 17 – René Antoine Ferchault de Réaumur, French physicist (born 1683)
