= Andrew Plummer =

Scottish chemist

- Born: 1697
- Died: 1756 (aged 58–59)
- Scientific career
- Fields: Chemistry
- Institutions: University of Edinburgh

Andrew Plummer FRCP (1697–1756) was a Scottish physician and chemist. He was professor of chemistry at the University of Edinburgh from 1726 to 1755. He developed ideas on the attractive and repulsive forces involved in chemical affinity, which later had influence on his successors William Cullen and Joseph Black. He compounded "Plummer's pills", a mixture of calomel and antimony sulfide with guaiacum; the pills were originally compounded to treat psoriasis but were used for more than a century as an antisyphilitic.
