= Guy de La Brosse =

French botanist and physician (1586-1641)

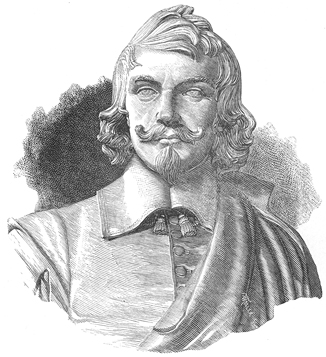
- Born: 1586; Rouen
- Died: August 31, 1641; Paris
- Burial place: Jardin des plantes

Guy de La Brosse (1586 – 1641 in Paris) was a French botanist, medical doctor, and pharmacist. A physician to King Louis XIII, he is notable for the creation the Jardin des Plantes de Paris (originally Jardin du Roi), the first botanical garden in Paris.

== Biography ==
Guy de La Brosse, medical doctor to Louis XIII, obtained royal permission on 6 July 1626 to found, in Paris, a herb garden destined to culture plants useful to medicine to replace those of Montpellier created by Henri IV in 1593. But this project took some time to come to fruition since the Faculty of Medicine in Paris considered the garden as competition to their activities, because La Brosse wished to teach botany and chemistry there.

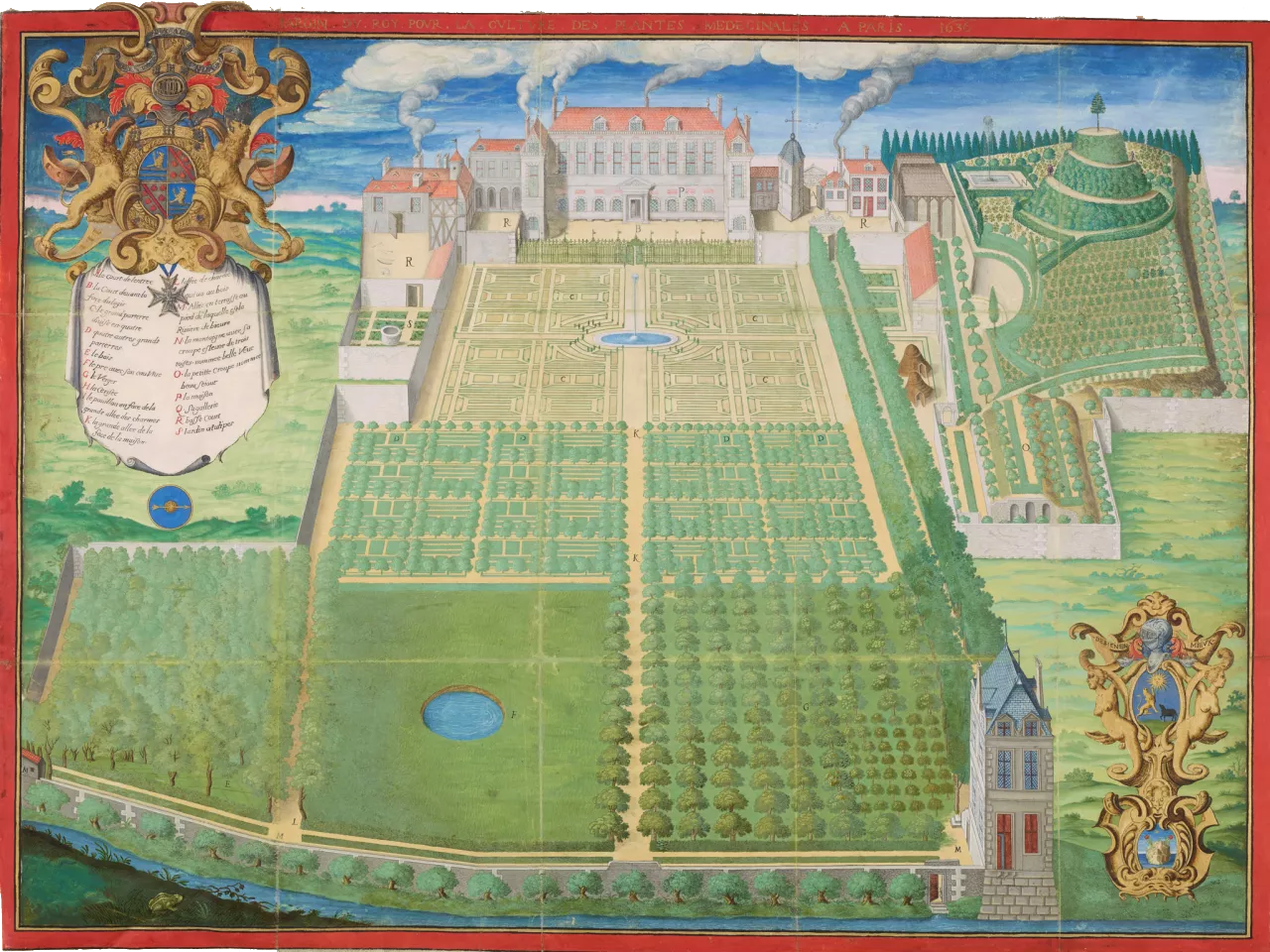
Scalberge, Jardin du Roy pour la culture des plantes médicinales à Paris, 1636, MNHN

This garden, called "Jardin du roi" (Garden of the King), would not be officially inaugurated until 1640, more than 5 years after its actual creation. To calm the university faculty, the king only authorised one teacher without diploma at the garden, with this choice being left to the garden supervisor.

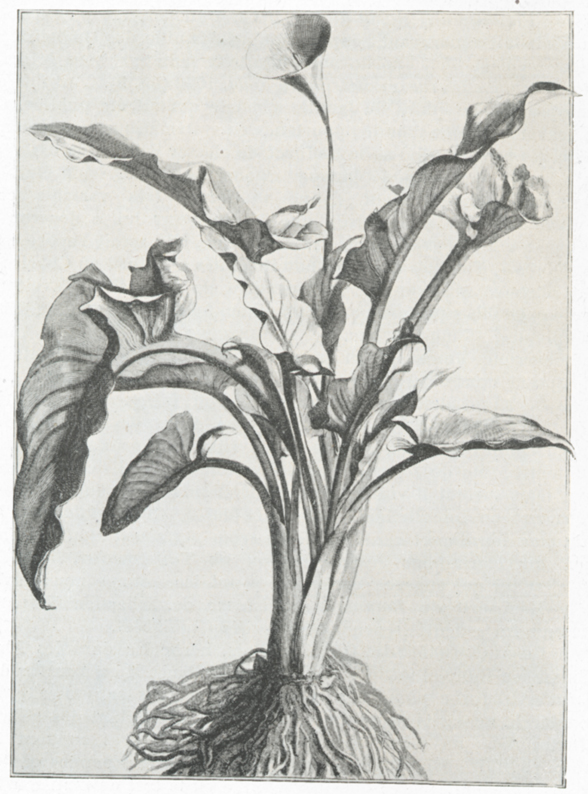
Calla aethopica, drawn Abraham Bosse, 1640

In 1628 La Brosse published "Dessin du Jardin Royal pour la culture des plantes médicinales" ("Design of the Royal Garden for the culture of medical plants"). It was published again with five supplementary woodcuts in 1640. It contained the nature, virtue and use of the medical plants, a catalogue of the plants currently being cultivated, and a plan of the garden. In 1631 he published "Avis pour le Jardin royal des plantes" ("Advice for the Royal Garden"). La Brosse had also planned the publication of a "Collection of planters of the Jardin du Roi" accompanied by four hundred copper plates attributed to Abraham Bosse (1602–1676), but his death prevented La Brosse from achieving this. The heirs of Guy de La Brosse sold the copper plates to a boiler-maker for the weight of the metal. Guy-Crescent Fagon (1638–1718), successor to de La Brosse in the post of Supervisor of the Jardin du Roi, could, after much effort, only locate fifty of them. Eventually Sébastien Vaillant (1669–1722) and Antoine de Jussieu (1686–1758) supplied a collection of 24 specimens.

The Jardin du Roi is now known as the Jardin des Plantes (Garden of Plants).

== Works ==
- Traicté de la peste, fait par Guy de La Brosse,... avec les remèdes préservatifs (1623)
- Dessin du Jardin Royal pour la culture des plantes médicinales (1928)
- De la nature, vertu, et utilité des plantes (1628)
- Avis pour le Jardin royal des plantes (1931)
- L'ouverture du Jardin royal de Paris (1640)
