= 1620s in architecture =

== Buildings and structures ==
=== Buildings ===
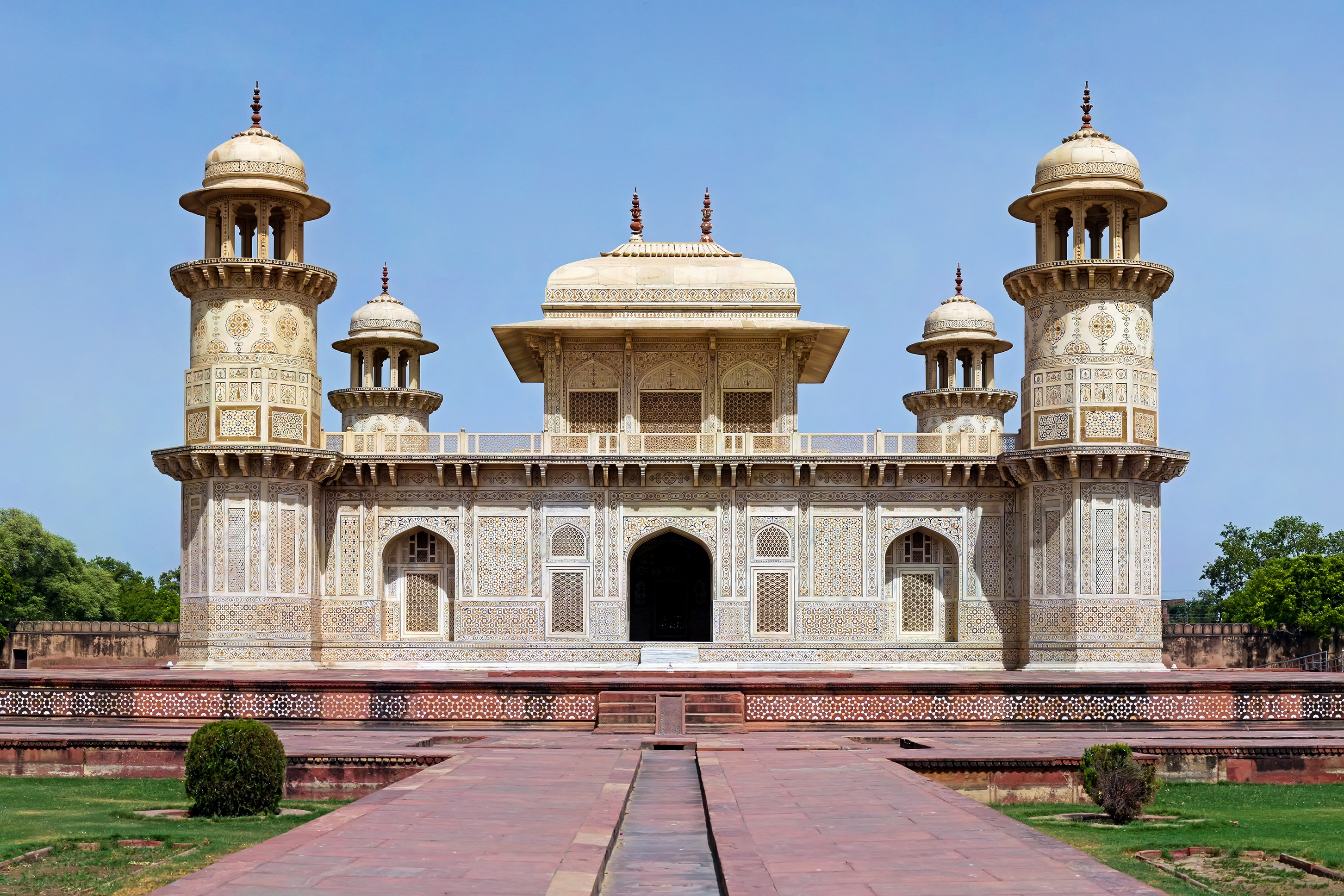
Tomb of I'timād-ud-Daulah, Agra

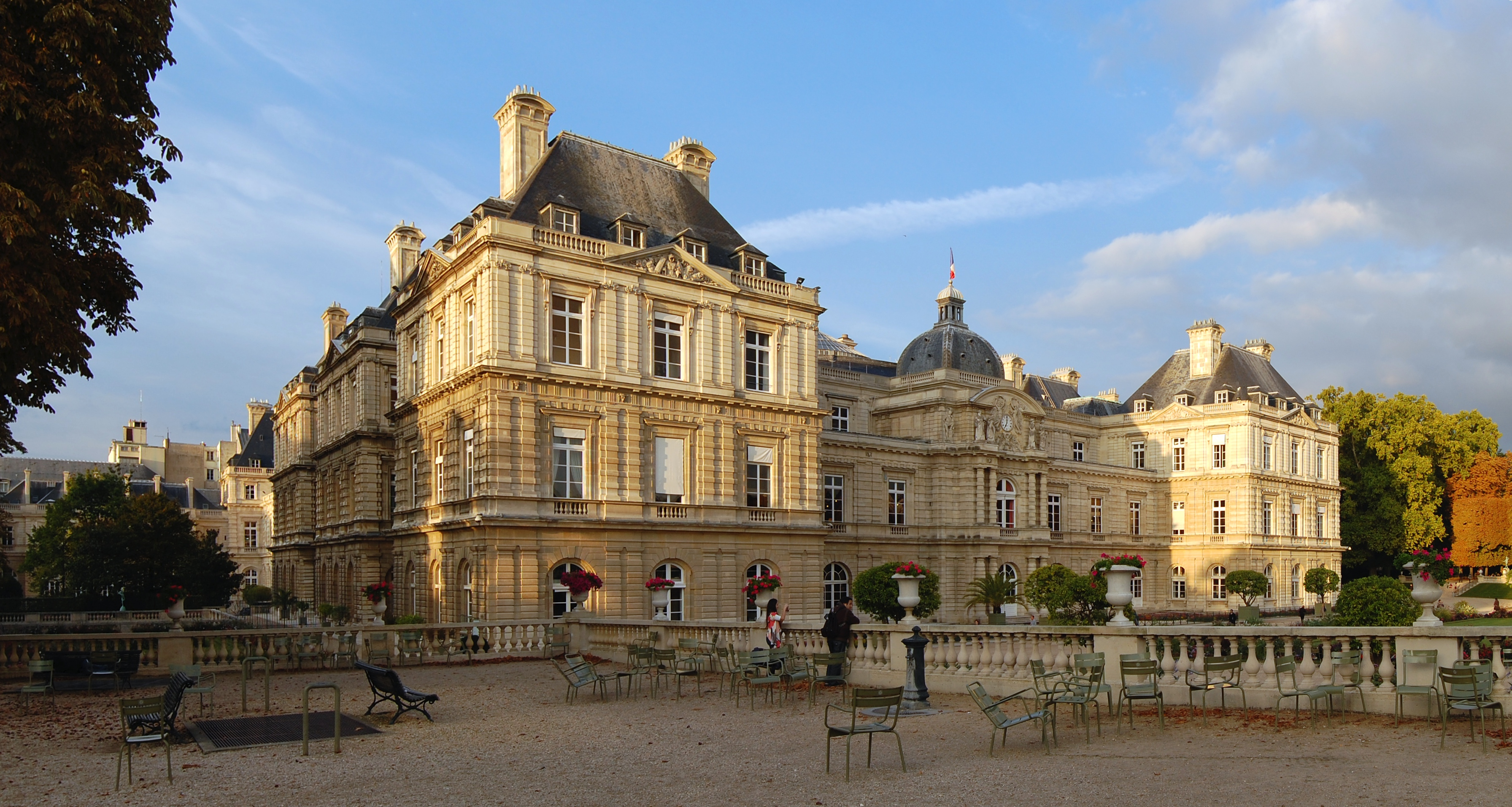
The Luxembourg Palace, Paris

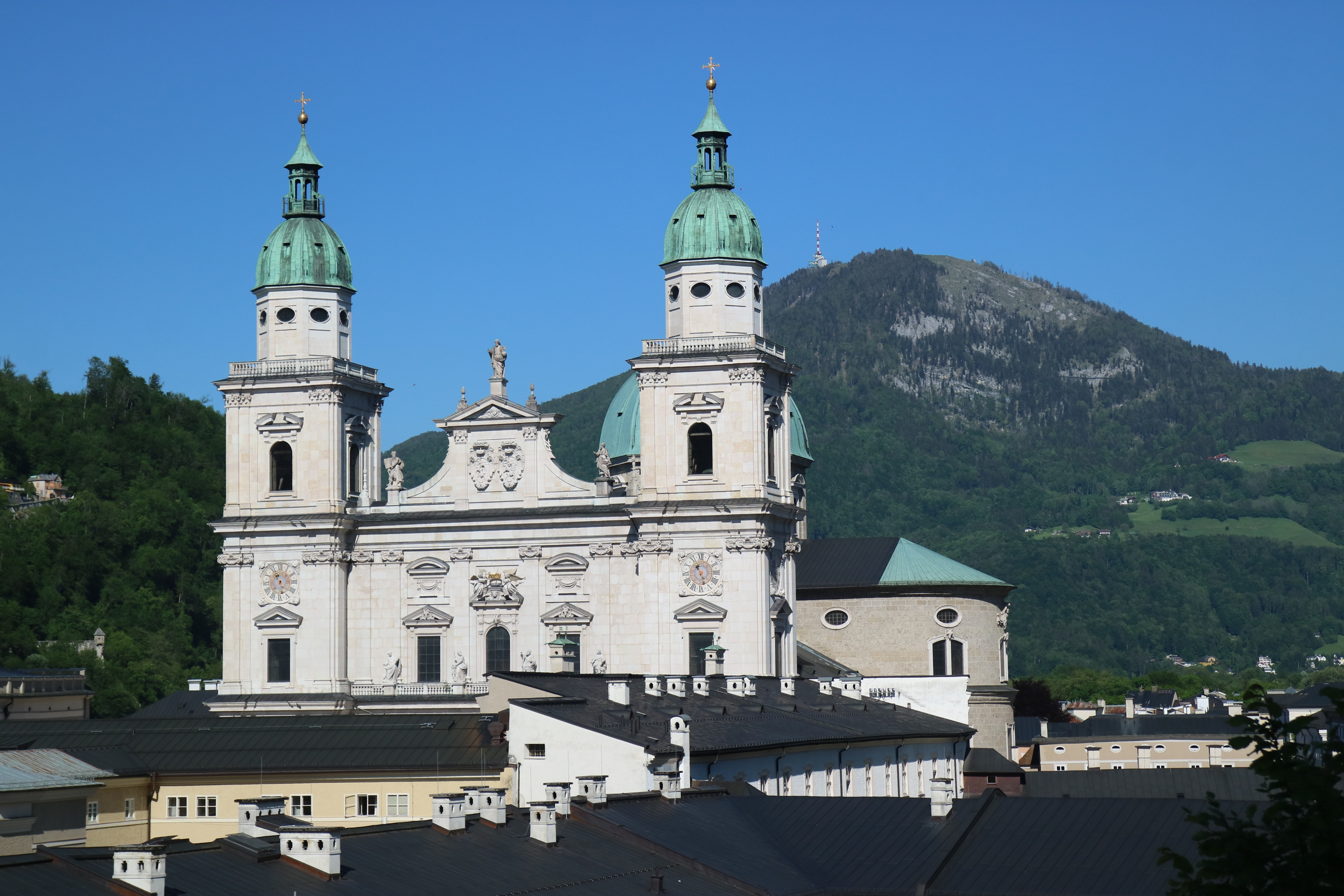
Salzburg Cathedral in Austria

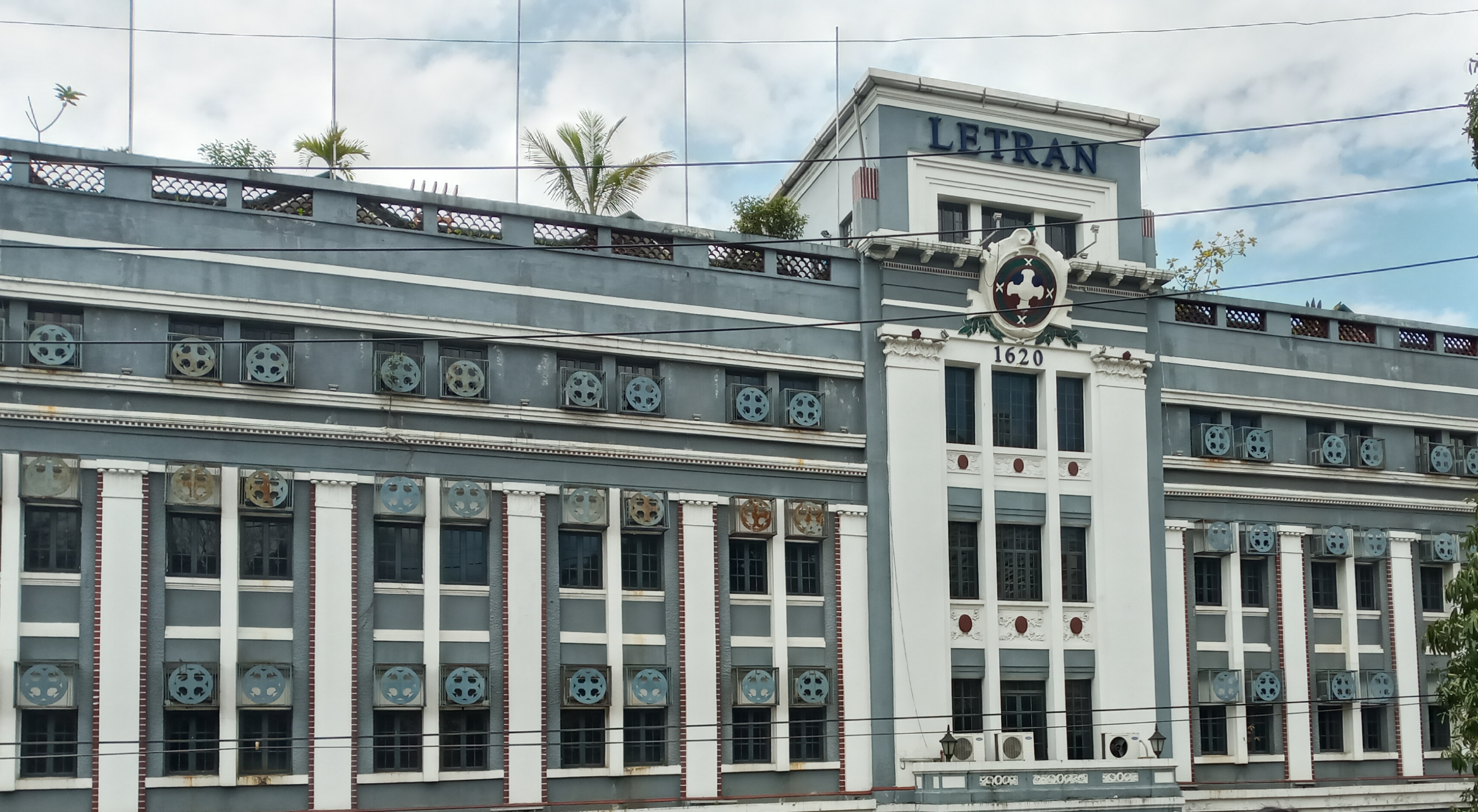
Colegio de San Juan de Letran, Manila, Philippines

- 1619 – Børsen in Copenhagen, Denmark designed by Lorentz and Hans van Steenwinckel the Younger, is begun (completed 1640)
- 1620
  - Work on Santa Maria delle Grazie Tower in Xgħajra, Malta begins.
  - Reconstruction of Frederiksborg Palace, Denmark, is completed by Hans van Steenwinckel the Younger following the death of his brother Lorentz.
  - Skaill House on Orkney is built.
- 1620 – Colegio de San Juan de Letran in Manila, Philippines.
- 1616–1621 – Church of St-Gervais-et-St-Protais, Paris, designed by Salomon de Brosse, is built.
- 1621 – Prince's Lodging at Newmarket, Suffolk, England, designed by Inigo Jones, completed.
- 1622–1628 – The Tomb of I'timād-ud-Daulah in Agra, India, is built.
- 1622 – The Banqueting House, Whitehall, London, is opened with a performance of Ben Jonson's The Masque of Augurs designed by the building's architect, Inigo Jones.
- 1623 – New Temple de Charenton-le-Pont, France, designed by Salomon de Brosse and Jean Thiriot, is built.
- 1624
  - St John's College Old Library, Cambridge, building is completed.
  - The Palace of Versailles is first built by order of King Louis XIII of France, as a hunting lodge.
- 1624–1626 – Façade of Santa Maria della Vittoria, Rome, designed by Giovanni Battista Soria, is built.
- 1623–1627 – Queen's Chapel at St James's Palace in London, designed by Inigo Jones, is built.
- 1615–1625 – Luxembourg Palace, Paris, designed by Salomon de Brosse, is built.
- c. 1625/26 – Coymans house, Keizersgracht, Amsterdam, designed by Jacob van Campen.
- 1626 – Rebuilding of Beopjusa Palsangjeon in Korea is completed.
- 1627
  - Palazzo Barberini in Rome begun by Carlo Maderno and Francesco Borromini (completed 1633).
  - Muchalls Castle in Scotland, reconstruction completed by Thomas Burnett of Leys.
- 1628
  - Salzburg Cathedral in Austria, designed by Santino Solari (after Vincenzo Scamozzi), consecrated.
  - George Heriot's Hospital in Edinburgh, Scotland.
- 1629 – Simtokha Dzong (castle-monastery) in Bhutan.

== Births ==
- 1620: November 2 (bapt.) – Roger Pratt, English gentleman architect (died 1684)
- 1621: October 2 (bapt.) – Hugh May, English architect (died 1684)

== Deaths ==
- 1620 – Bontadino de Bontadini, Bolognese-born hydraulic engineer, architect, mathematician and woodcarver, murdered
- 1626: December 9 – Salomon de Brosse, French architect (born 1571)
- 1627: July 17 – Lieven de Key, Dutch architect (born 1560)
- 1629: January 30 – Carlo Maderno, Ticinese-born architect (born 1556)
