= 1620 in science =

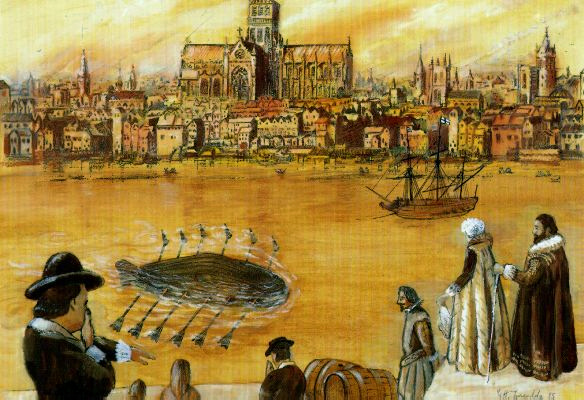
Drebbel's first navigable submarine, in England

The year 1620 in science and technology involved some significant events.

== Astronomy ==
- The work of Copernicus (died 1543) is edited and released, as directed by the Congregation of the Index (reading forbidden in March 1616): nine sentences, which state the heliocentric system as certain, are either omitted or changed.

== Cartography ==
- The atlas Atlante geografico d'Italia, compiled by Giovanni Antonio Magini, is published posthumously.

== Chemistry ==
- The scientific method of reasoning is expounded by Francis Bacon in his Novum Organum.

== Earth sciences ==
- Francis Bacon notices the jigsaw fit of the opposite shores of the Atlantic Ocean.

== Medicine ==
- Nicholas Habicot, surgeon to the Duke of Nemours, publishes a report of four successful "bronchotomies" which he has performed; these include the first recorded case of a tracheotomy for the removal of a thrombus and the first pediatric tracheotomy, to extract a foreign body from a 14-year-old's esophagus.

== Technology ==
- May 17 – The first carousel is seen at a fair (Philippapolis, Turkey).
- Cornelis Drebbel builds the first navigable submarine, in England.

== Births ==
- April? – William Brouncker, Anglo-Irish mathematician (died 1684)
- July 21 – Jean Picard, French astronomer (died 1682)
- September 25 – François Bernier, French physician and traveller (died 1688)
- December 23 - Johann Jakob Wepfer, Swiss pathologist and pharmacologist (died 1695)
- Ralph Bathurst, English theologian, physician and academic (died 1704)
- Bernard de Gomme, Dutch-born military engineer (died 1685)
- Edme Mariotte, French physicist and priest (died 1684)
- Robert Morison, Scottish botanist and taxonomist (died 1683)

== Deaths ==
- Simon Stevin, Flemish scientist (born c. 1548)
