= 1623 in science =

The year 1623 in science and technology involved some significant events.

== Astronomy ==
- July 16 – Great conjunction of Jupiter and Saturn, the closest together the two planets come until 2020.

== Biology ==
- Apple orchard at Grönsö Manor in Sweden planted; it will still be productive into the 21st century.

== Psychology ==
- Erotomania is first mentioned in a psychiatric treatise.

== Technology ==
- Wilhelm Schickard draws a calculating clock on a letter to Kepler. This will be the first of five unsuccessful attempts at designing a direct entry calculating clock in the 17th century (including the designs of Tito Burattini, Samuel Morland and René Grillet).

== Births ==
- June 19 – Blaise Pascal, French mathematician and physicist (died 1662)
- July 12 – Elizabeth Walker, English pharmacist (died 1690)
- August 26 – Johann Sigismund Elsholtz, German naturalist and physician (died 1688)
- September 1 – Caspar Schamberger, German surgeon and merchant (died 1706)
- September 23 – Georg Balthasar Metzger, German physician and scientist (died 1687)
- October 9 – Ferdinand Verbiest, Flemish Jesuit Sinologist and astronomer (died 1688)
- Margaret Lucas, later Margaret Cavendish, Duchess of Newcastle-upon-Tyne, English natural philosopher (died 1673)

== Deaths ==
- May 26 – Francis Anthony, English apothecary and physician (born 1550)
- December 24 – Michiel Coignet, Flemish engineer, cosmographer, mathematician and scientific instrument-maker (born 1549)
