= 1627 in science =

The year 1627 in science and technology involved some significant events.

== Astronomy ==
- Johannes Kepler's Rudolphine Tables are published.

== Exploration ==
- January – The Dutch ship 't Gulden Zeepaert, skippered by François Thijssen, sails along the south coast of Australia.

== Medicine ==
- Adriaan van den Spiegel's De humani corporis fabrica is published posthumously in Venice with illustrations by Giulio Casserio.
- Gaspare Aselli's De lactibus sive lacteis venis is published posthumously in Milan.

== Publications ==
- Francis Bacon's Sylva Sylvarum, or A Natural History and New Atlantis are published posthumously.

== Births ==
- January 25 – Robert Boyle, Anglo-Irish chemist (died 1691)
- November 29 – John Ray, English naturalist (died 1705)

== Deaths ==
- February 22 – Olivier van Noort Dutch circumnavigator (born 1558)
- July 20 – Guðbrandur Þorláksson, Icelandic mathematician and cartographer (born 1541)
- October 21 – Frederick de Houtman, Dutch explorer (born 1571)
