= 1629 in science =

The year 1629 in science and technology involved some significant events.

== Botany ==
- In London, John Parkinson publishes Paradisi in Sole Paradisus Terrestris.

== Chemistry ==
- English alchemist Arthur Dee, court physician to Michael I of Russia, compiles Fasciculus Chemicus, Chymical Collections. Expressing the Ingress, Progress, and Egress, of the Secret Hermetick Science out of the choicest and most famous authors.

== Medicine ==
- Plague breaks out in Mantua and spreads to Milan.
- In Toulouse, Niall Ó Glacáin publishes Tractatus de Peste.

== Technology ==
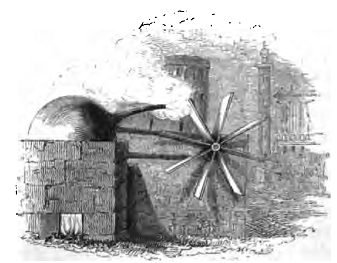
Giovanni Branca's steam turbine

- In Rome, Giovanni Branca publishes Le Machine volume nuovo, et di molto artificio da fare effetti maravigliosi tanto Spiritali quanto di Animale Operatione, arichito di bellissime figure.

== Births ==
- April 14 – Christiaan Huygens, Dutch mathematician and physicist (died 1695)
- Laurent Cassegrain, French priest and physicist (died 1693)
- Jan Commelijn, Dutch botanist (died 1692)
- Christophe Glaser, Swiss pharmacian (died 1672)
- Johann Glaser, Swiss anatomist (died 1675)
- Agnes Block, Dutch horticulturalist (died 1704)

== Deaths ==
- July 13 – Caspar Bartholin the Elder, Danish polymath, physician and theologian (born 1585)
- Giovanni Faber, German papal doctor and botanist (born 1574)
