= 1634 in science =

The year 1634 in science and technology involved some significant events.

== Astronomy ==
- Johannes Kepler's fictional account of the view from the Moon Somnium (written 1608) is published posthumously by his son.

== Botany ==
- Thomas Johnson begins publishing Mercurius Botanicus, including a list of indigenous British plants.

== Mathematics ==
- Gilles de Roberval shows that the area under a cycloid is three times the area of its generating circle.

== Medicine ==
- Louise Bourgeois Boursier publishes her Collection of Secrets on obstetrics in Paris, including techniques such as podalic version.

== Zoology ==
- Publication of Insectorum sive Minimorum Animalium Theatrum in London, compiled posthumously from the work of Edward Wotton, Conrad Gesner and Thomas Penny by Thomas Muffet and prepared for publication by Théodore de Mayerne.

== Institutions ==
- The Académie Française is formed by Cardinal Richelieu (it will be formally established in 1635).

== Deaths ==
- February 15 – Wilhelm Fabry, German-born surgeon (born 1560)
- June 26 – Nikolaus Ager, French botanist (born 1568)
- Marin le Bourgeoys, French inventor and artist (born c. 1550) (approximate date)
- Martin Llewellyn, British cartographer (born 1565?)
