= 1647 in science =

The year 1647 in science and technology involved some significant events.

== Astronomy ==
- Johannes Hevelius publishes the first comparatively detailed map of the Moon in his Selenographia, sive Lunae descriptio (Danzig).

== Births ==
- January 17 – Elisabeth Hevelius, Danzig astronomer (died 1693)
- March 20 – Jean de Hautefeuille, French inventor (died 1724)
- April 2 – Maria Sybilla Merian, German lepidopterist (died 1717)
- August 22 – Denis Papin, French physicist (died c. 1712)
- December 7 – Giovanni Ceva, Italian mathematician (died 1734)

== Deaths ==
- March 29 – Charles Butler, English beekeeper (born 1560)
- October 8 – Christen Sørensen Longomontanus, Danish astronomer (born 1562)
- October 25 – Evangelista Torricelli, Italian physicist and mathematician (born 1608)
