= 1636 in science =

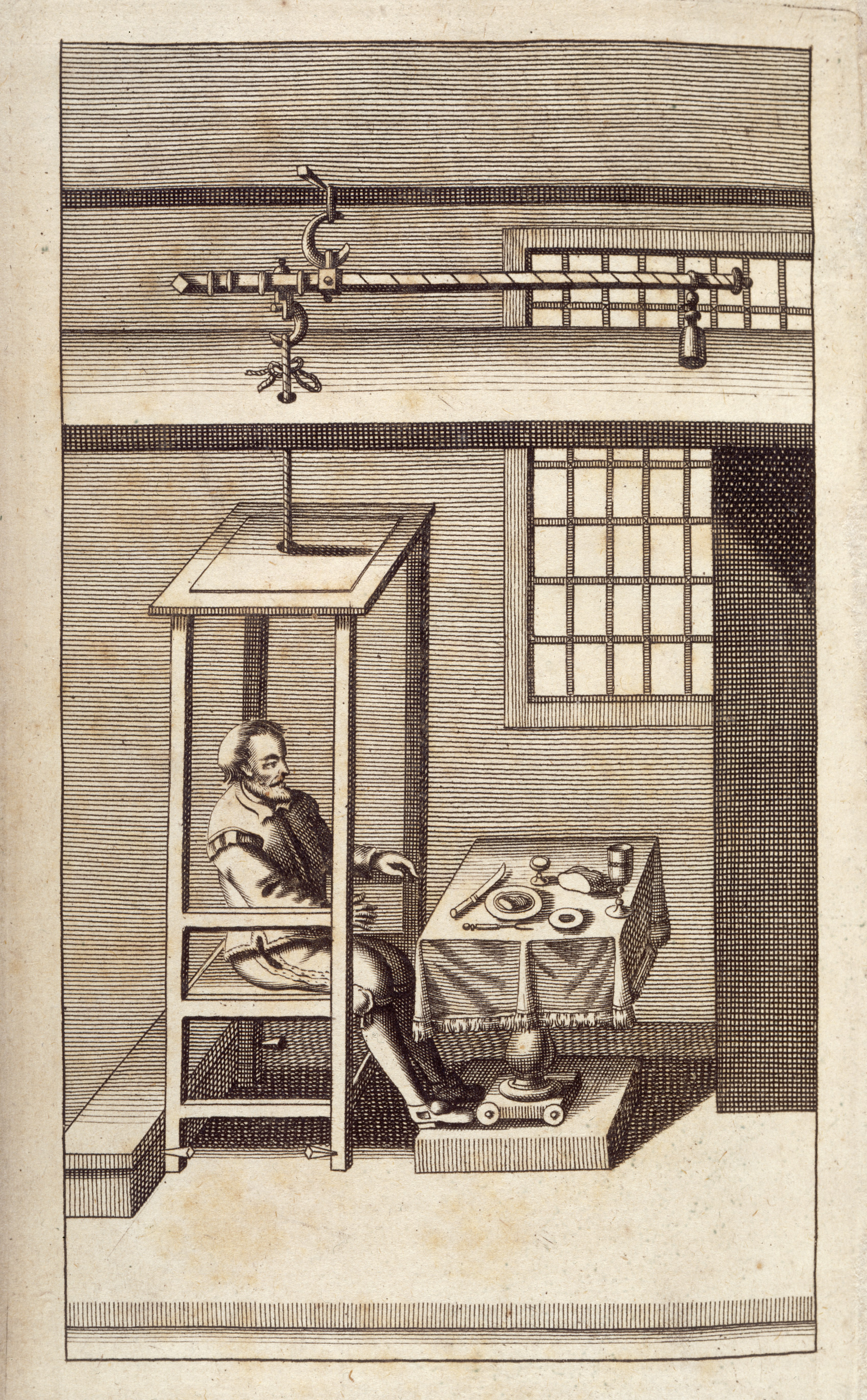
Frontispiece engraving showing Sanctorio sitting in the balance that he constructed to determine the net weight change over time after the intake and excretion of food stuffs and fluids

The year 1636 in science and technology involved some significant events.

== Mathematics ==
- Pierre de Fermat begins to circulate his work in analytic geometry in manuscript.
- Muhammad Baqir Yazdi and René Descartes independently discover the pair of amicable numbers 9,363,584 and 9,437,056.

== Physics ==
- Marin Mersenne publishes his Traité de l'harmonie universelle, containing Mersenne's laws describing the frequency of oscillation of a stretched string.

== Publications ==
- Daniel Schwenter publishes Delicia Physic-Mathematicae, including a description of a quill pen with an ink reservoir.

== Births ==
- Father Jacques Marquette, French explorer (died 1675)
- December 26 – Justine Siegemund, German midwife (died 1705)

== Deaths ==
- February 22 – Sanctorius, Italian physiologist (born 1561)
- Louise Bourgeois Boursier, French Royal midwife (born 1563)
- Michal Sedziwój, Polish alchemist (born 1566)
