= 1633 in science =

The year 1633 in science and technology involved some significant events.

== Events ==
- June 22 – Galileo Galilei, the Italian scientist, is convicted of heresy by the Inquisition for his book Dialogue Concerning the Two Chief World Systems. He is sentenced to house arrest for the remainder of his life.

== Botany ==
- Jesuit scholar Giovanni Baptista Ferrari publishes De Florum Cultura in Rome, a pioneering text in floriculture.

== Chemistry ==
- The first, crude, isolation of lactose, by Italian physician Fabrizio Bartoletti (1576–1630), is published.

== Births ==
- c. May 1 – Sébastien Le Prestre de Vauban, French military engineer (died 1707)
- May 28 - Nicolas Venette, French physician, sexologist and writer (died 1698)
- November 3 – Bernardino Ramazzini, Italian physician, a founder of occupational medicine (died 1714)

== Deaths ==
- November 7 – Cornelius Drebbel, Dutch inventor who built the first navigable submarine (born 1572)
- November 8 – Xu Guangqi, Chinese polymath (born 1562)
