= 1632 in science =

The year 1632 in science and technology involved some significant events.

== Events ==
- The University of Tartu in Swedish Livonia is founded.

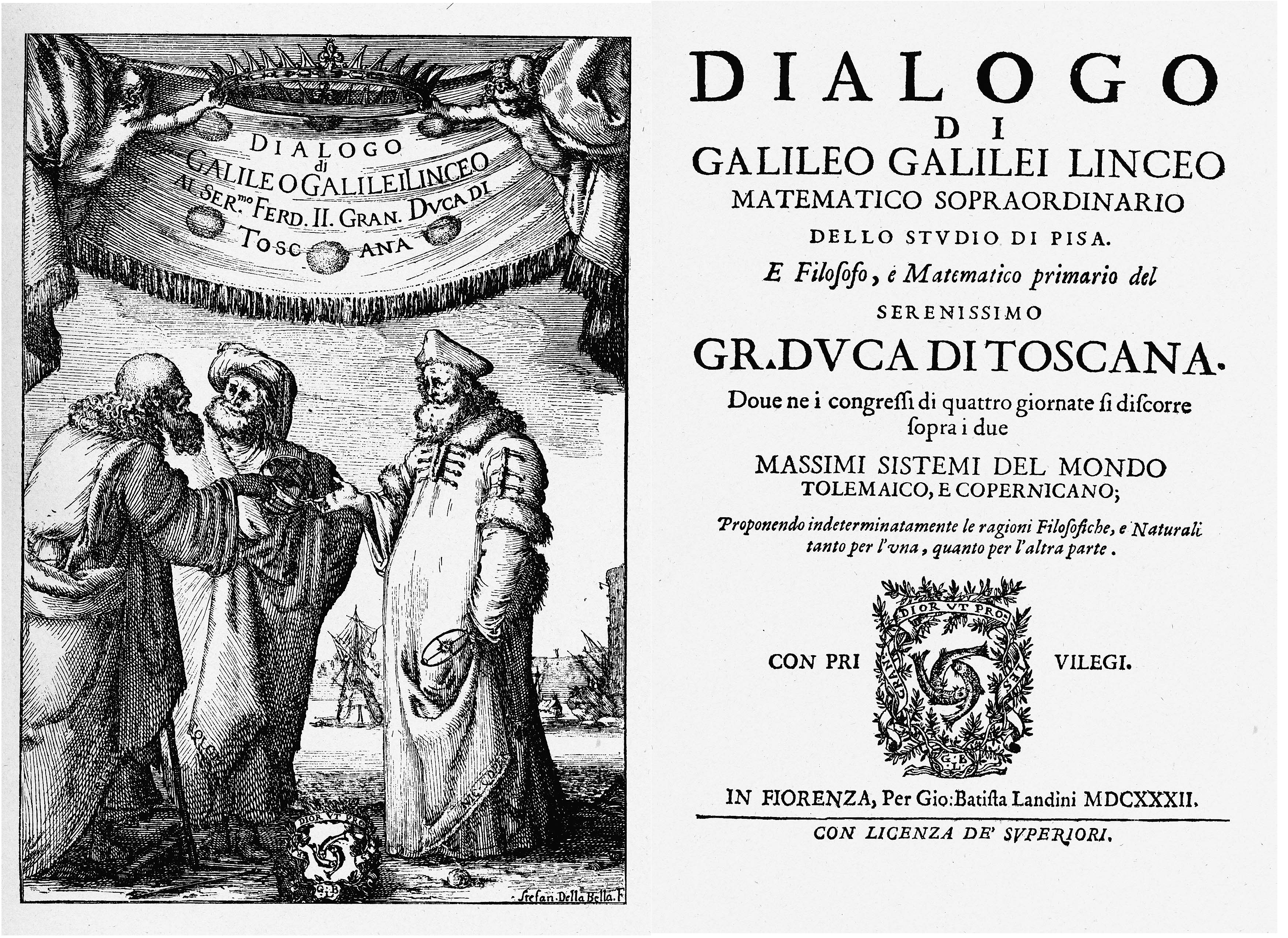
Frontispiece and title page of Galileo's Dialogue

== Astronomy ==
- February 22 – Galileo's Dialogue Concerning the Two Chief World Systems (Dialogo sopra i due massimi sistemi del mondo), comparing the Copernican system with the traditional Ptolemaic view, is published in Florence and delivered to his patron, Ferdinando II de' Medici, Grand Duke of Tuscany.
- August 9 – Leiden University in the Dutch Republic resolves to erect the world's first official observatory.

== Earth sciences ==
- Martine Bertereau, Baroness de Beausoleil, publishes Véritable déclaration de la découverte des mines et minières.

== Births ==
- October 24 – Anton van Leeuwenhoek, Dutch pioneer of microscopy (died 1723)
- Henry Compton, English bishop and botanist (died 1713)

== Deaths ==
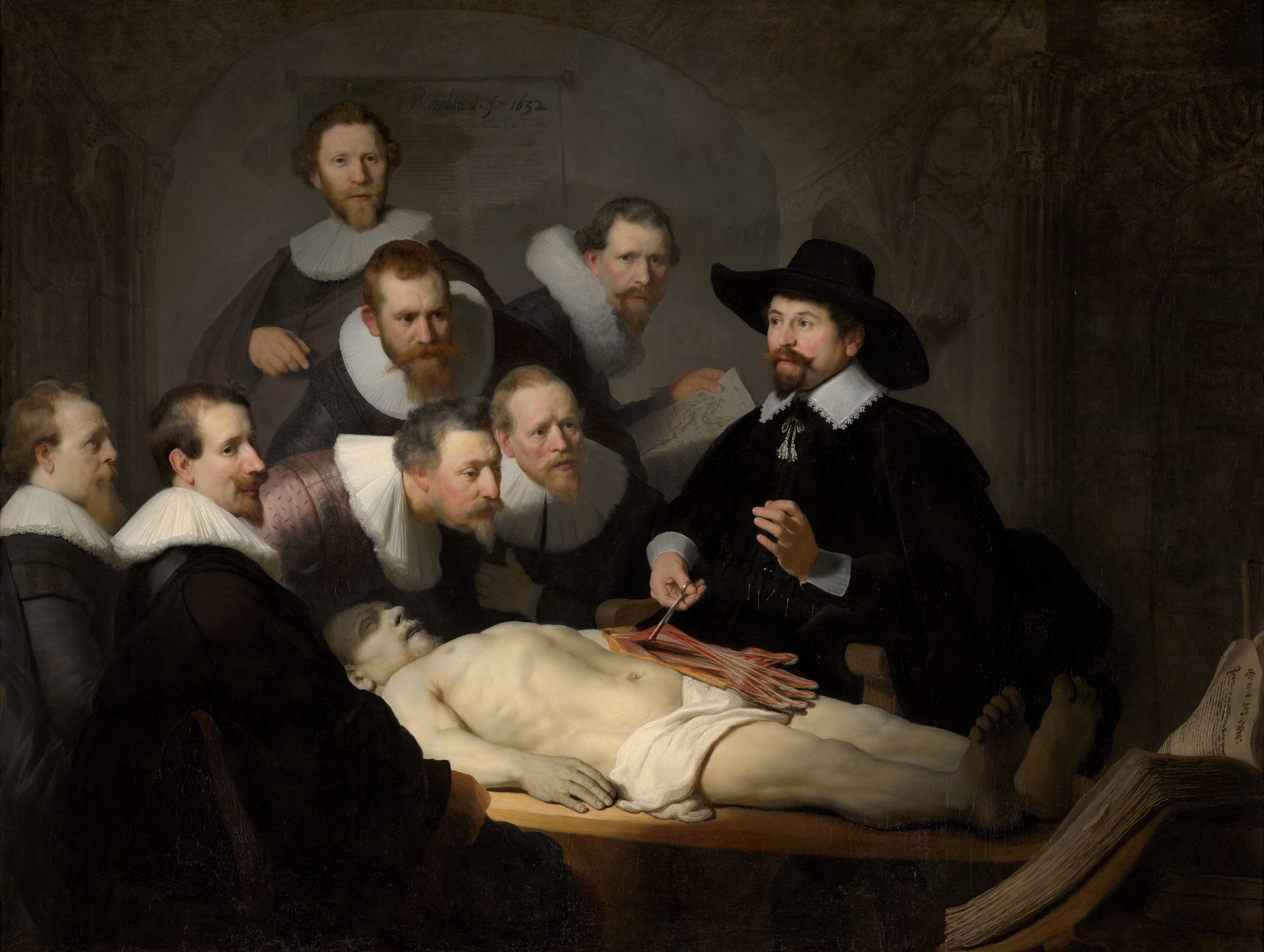
The Anatomy Lesson of Dr. Nicolaes Tulp by Rembrandt (1632)

- January 31 – Jost Bürgi, Swiss clockmaker and mathematician (born 1552)
- May 24 – Robert Hues, English mathematician and geographer (born 1553)
- June 21 – Anselmus de Boodt, Flemish mineralogist and physician (born 1550)
- September 4 (bur.) – Hessel Gerritsz, Dutch cartographer (born c. 1581)
- November 17 – Pierre Richer de Belleval, French botanist (born c. 1564)
- December 8 – Philippe van Lansberge, Flemish astronomer (born 1561)
