= 1637 in science =

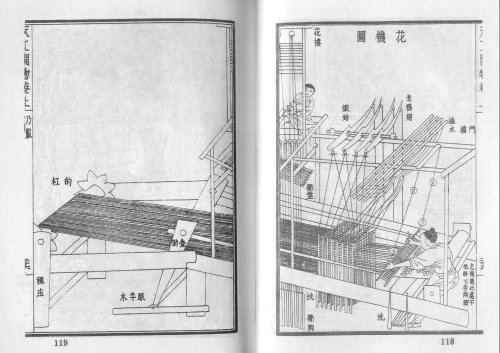
A Chinese drawing for figure-weaving published in 1637 by the Ming-Dynasty encyclopedist Song Yingxing.

The year 1637 in science and technology involved some significant events.

== Mathematics ==
- René Descartes promotes intellectual rigour in Discours de la méthode pour bien conduire sa raison, et chercher la vérité dans les sciences and introduces the Cartesian coordinate system in its appendix La Géométrie (published in Leiden).
- Pierre de Fermat conjectures Fermat's Last Theorem.

== Publications ==
- May – Chinese encyclopedist Song Yingxing publishes his Tiangong Kaiwu ("Exploitation of the Works of Nature").

== Births ==
- February 12 – Jan Swammerdam, Dutch naturalist, pioneer of comparative anatomy and entomology (died 1680)
- François Mauriceau, French obstetrician (died 1709)

== Deaths ==
- June 24 – Nicolas-Claude Fabri de Peiresc, French astronomer (born 1580)
- May 19 – Isaac Beeckman, Dutch philosopher and scientist (born 1588)
- Henry Gellibrand, English mathematician (born 1597)
