= 2022 in science =

The following scientific events occurred in 2022.

== Events ==
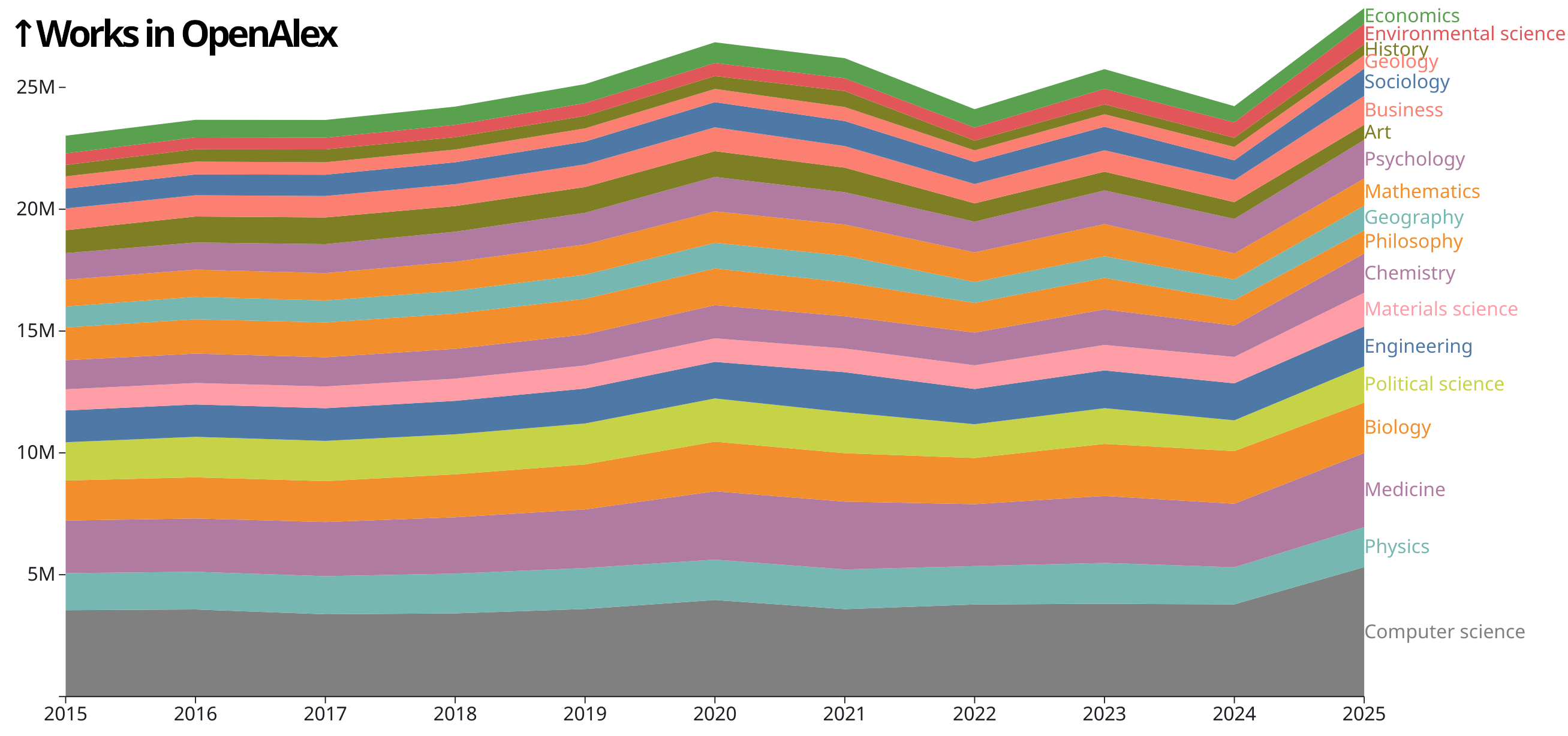
3 January: A free online index with metadata about over 200 million scientific documents is launched, OpenAlex. The graphs (full) show one visualization of recent developments of science overall based on this data (fewer papers may not be associated with decreasing success, priority, impact or activity).

=== October ===
1 October: A new, more detailed simulation of the giant-impact hypothesis suggests that the Moon formed in just hours.

- 1 October – A new simulation by NASA finds that the Moon likely formed within a matter of hours, as opposed to earlier theories that proposed a much longer period of months or years.
- 4 October – Edmonton Police Service reports the use of DNA phenotyping to generate 3D facial images of crime suspects.

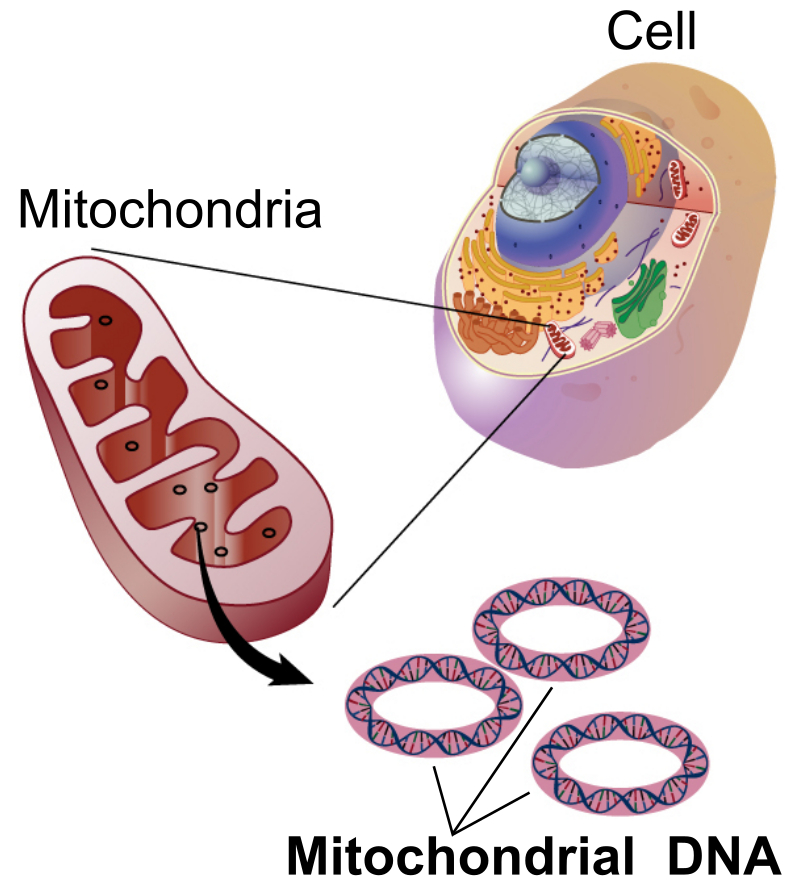
5 October: Ongoing transfer of mitochondrial DNA into DNA in the cell nucleus is reported.

- 5 October
  - The New York Times summarizes those awarded Nobel Prizes in the Sciences for the year 2022:
    - Physiology or Medicine (October 3): Svante Pääbo for discoveries involving genomes of extinct hominins
    - Physics (October 4): Alain Aspect, John F. Clauser and Anton Zeilinger for work in quantum technology
    - Chemistry (October 5): Carolyn R. Bertozzi, Morten Meldal and K. Barry Sharpless for studies on click chemistry and bioorthogonal chemistry.
  - Scientists report the discovery of ongoing transfer of mitochondrial DNA into DNA in the cell nucleus. Previously, nuclear-mitochondrial segments (NUMT) were thought to have arisen only long ago. 66 thousand whole-genome sequences indicate this currently occurs as frequent as once in every ~4,000 human births.
  - Researchers outline the large potentials and benefits of marine algae-based aquaculture for the development of a future healthy and sustainable food system.
  - Scientists demonstrate the use of organoids for the study of brain development, identifying and investigating genetic switches that have a significant impact on it using single-cell transcriptome readouts.

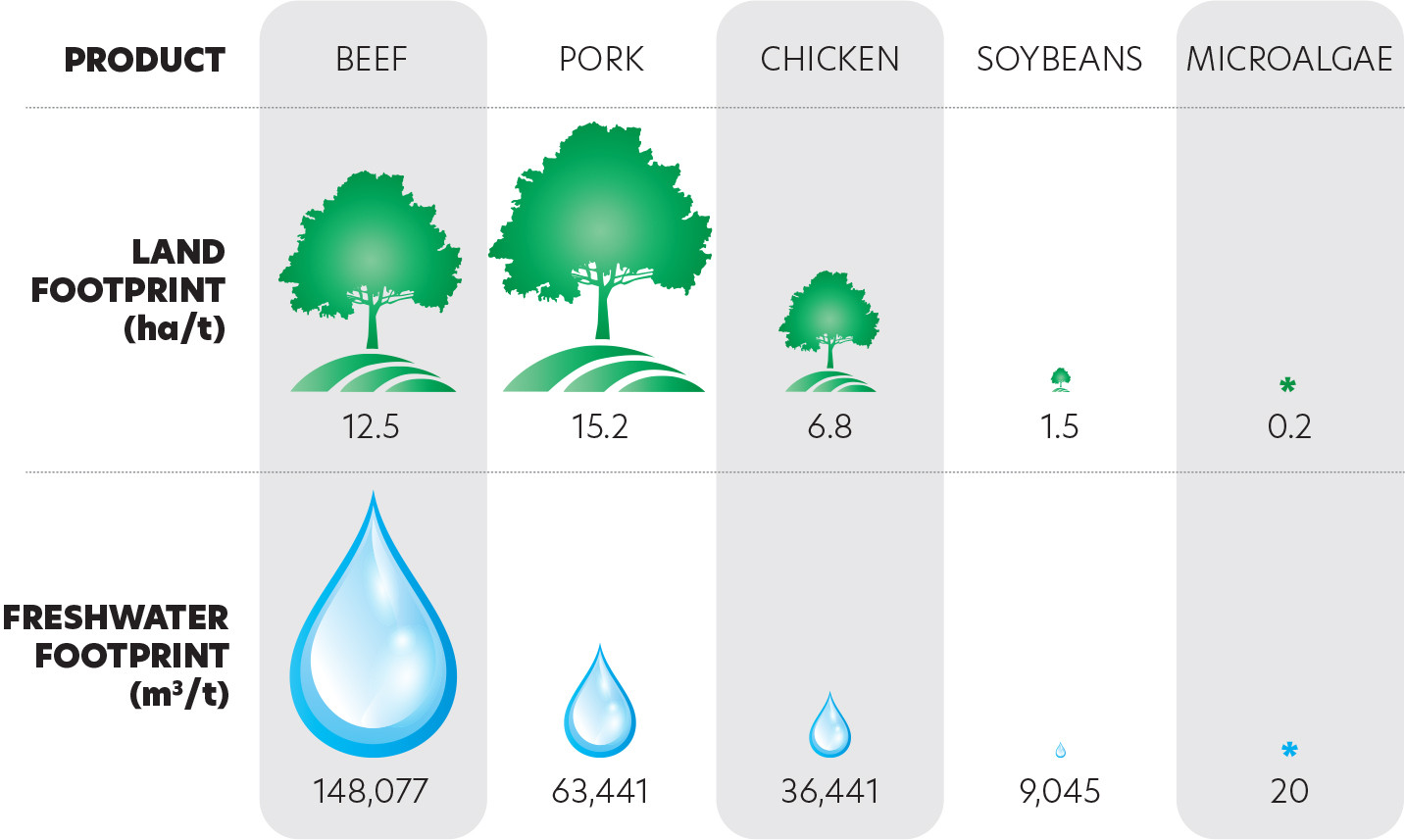
5 October: Researchers outline the large potentials and benefits of marine algae-based aquaculture for the development of a future healthy and sustainable food system.

- 6 October
  - An open source platform to match genomically profiled cancer patients to precision medicine drug trials is reported.
  - Neuroscientists report PFC-Hb connectivity white matter impairment in both cocaine and heroin addiction.
- 7 October
  - News outlets report about a study published on 28 September theorizing that the supercontinent Amasia will form within 300 million years when the Pacific Ocean closes.
  - Neuroscientists report experimental MRI results that so far appear to imply nuclear proton spins of 'brain water' in the brain were entangled, suggesting brain functions that operate non-classically which may support quantum mechanisms being involved in consciousness as the signal pattern declined when human participants fell asleep.
- 8 October – Researchers report recommendations concerning potential geopolitical implications of potential future information about or from extraterrestrial intelligence.

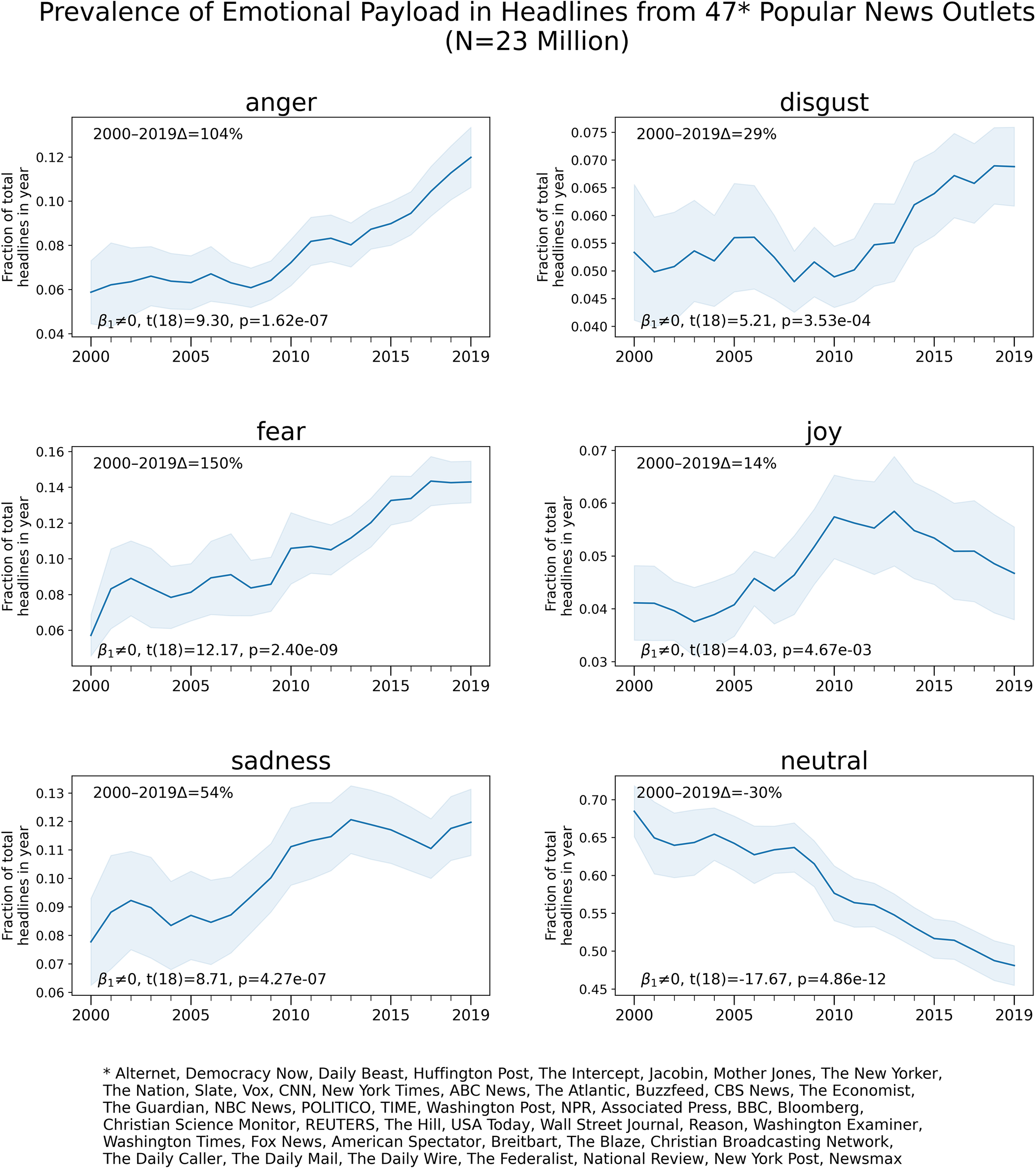
18 October: Substantial increase of sentiment negativity and decrease of emotional neutrality in headlines across written popular news media since 2000 is reported.

- 12 October
  - Researchers report successful transplantation of human brain tissue organoids into baby rats. Such research could eventually controversially raise ethical issues relating to (non-)human intelligence/consciousness/welfare and be used to model human brain development and, as demonstrated, to investigate diseases (and their potential therapies). Unlike in other recent studies, the tissues appeared to be highly functional, to mature and to integrate with the rat brain.
  - A study reports that in a cohort of symptomatically infected, 46% had only partially recovered after 12 months, that asymptomatic infection was not associated with adverse outcomes of long COVID and that vaccination was associated with reduced risk of seven long-term symptoms. A meta-analysis published on the same day reports substantial exercise intolerance more than 3 months after infection in long COVID-19 patients. It notes that post-exertional malaise has been reported in long COVID-19 similar to CFS.
- 13 October
  - A novel synthetic biology-based process for recycling of plastics mixtures is presented.
  - Scientists report that in some cases, some apparently senescent cells – which are targeted by anti-aging senolytics – are required for regeneration.
- 14 October – Scientists from Boston University publish unauthorized (but legal) research on SARS-CoV-2 BA.1 Omicron via creation of a highly transmissible recombinant virus as a preprint, described by "many" but not all as "irresponsible gain-of-function" research.
- 18 October – A study indicates there has been a substantial increase of sentiment negativity and decrease of emotional neutrality in headlines across written popular news media since 2000.
- 19 October – A novel type of effective hydrogen storage using readily available salts is reported.
- 20 October
  - A study of PNMN, the world's largest no-fishing zone, finds a "spillover benefit" for migratory species like bigeye and yellowfin tuna.
  - The first data transmission to exceed 1 petabit per second (Pbit/s) using only a single laser and a single optical chip is demonstrated by European researchers.
- 21 October – News outlets report about a novel agricultural robot for viable weed control using lasers or "laserweeding". There are similar precision agriculture machines that have been reported before, also e.g. applying low amounts of herbicides and fertilizers with precision while mapping plant locations, in some cases autonomously. Their benefits may include "healthier crops and soil, decreased herbicide use, and reduced chemical and labor costs".
- 24 October
  - The NHS launches 'Our Future Health', one of the world's largest health and genetic data gathering projects, aimed at building a long-term repository of information for researchers. Five million UK adults are invited to participate.
  - "Hybrid viral particles (HVPs)" are reported, combining IAV and RSV in vitro.
- 25 October – A comprehensive annually scheduled study finds climate change is "undermining every dimension of global health monitored" and reports dire conclusions from tracking of impact indicators.
- 26 October
  - In two studies, scientists report findings about the role of epigenetics – which is shaped during lifetime – in colorectal cancer, including that it is a major component of how an individual tumor varies and findings about its influences on the accumulation of DNA mutations and cancer phenotypes.
  - At the 30th anniversary of the World Scientists' Warning to Humanity, scientists conclude that "We are now at 'code red' on planet Earth", facing a climate emergency, warning citizens and world leaders to take necessary actions with information about tracked "recent climate-related disasters, assess[ed] planetary vital signs, and [...] policy recommendations".
  - A study concludes that cosmic radiation events in the tree-ring radiocarbon record called "Miyake events", don't appear to be caused by the solar cycle (i.e. solar flares) as thought previously and have extended durations. They occurred every ~1,000 years on average and may threaten global technologies this century.
  - A magnetical guidance system with engineered bacterial microbots for 'precision targeting' is demonstrated to be effective for fighting cancer in mice.
- 31 October
  - Multiple traces of monkeypox are detected in non-sewered wastewater with sparse sampling from a densely populated metropolitan area in Asia.
  - A new record for the longest-frozen embryos to ever result in a live birth is reported in the United States, with twins born after storage for 30 years.

=== November ===
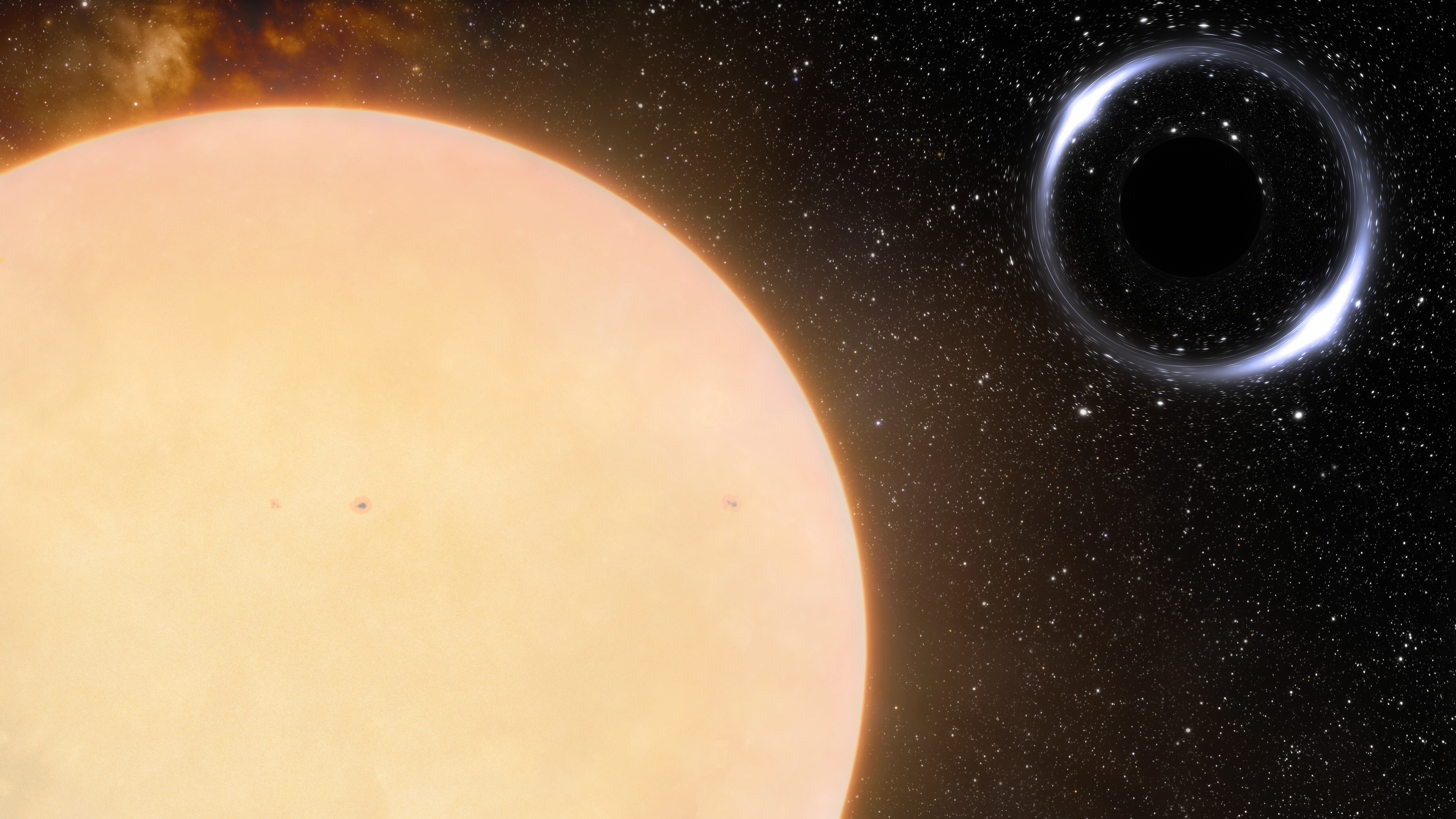
4 November: Artist's impression of the Gaia BH1 system, containing a Sun-like star and the closest known black hole to Earth.

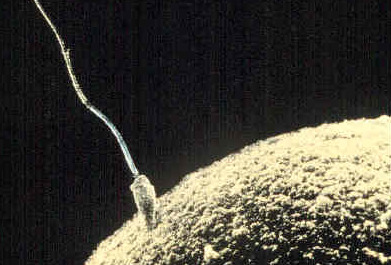
15 November: A 62% decline in sperm counts is found to have occurred since the early 1970s.

- 1 November – A pooled analysis indicates that globally over half of all preschool-aged children and over two-thirds of all nonpregnant women of reproductive age are deficient in at least one of three micronutrients each. The study notes required data is scarce and such deficiencies can constrain physical and (neurocognitive) development and compromise health.
- 2 November – Scientists show that cells move faster in thicker (higher viscosity) fluids. Cancer cells can form memory of extracellular fluid, helping them to form distant cancerous colonies more efficiently when exposed to fluids of higher viscosities.
- 3 November – Astronomers using the IXPE space observatory report that 4U 0142+61, a magnetar found 13,000 light-years from Earth, likely has a solid surface with no atmosphere.
- 4 November – The discovery of Gaia BH1, a binary system containing what is likely the closest known black hole to Earth, is reported by astronomers in the U.S.
- 6–18 November – The 2022 United Nations Climate Change Conference (COP27) on climate change mitigation takes place in Sharm el-Sheikh, Egypt.
- 7 November
  - The first clinical trial of laboratory-grown red blood cells transfused into people begins.
  - Scientists warn about summarized effects of climate change on insects, among other novel stressors, which may "drastically reduce our ability to build a sustainable future based on healthy, functional ecosystems", providing several recommended mitigation options.
  - The development of organic artificial neurons that function in and with biological systems, partly mimicking neurons' communication, is reported.
- 9 November
  - IBM unveils its 433-qubit 'Osprey' quantum processor, the successor to its Eagle system.
  - A study shows that 50+ aged users of the dietary program SNAP "had about 2 fewer years of cognitive aging over a 10-year period compared with non-users" despite it having nearly no conditions for the sustainability and healthiness of the food products purchased with the coupons (or coupon-credits).
- 10 November
  - A study describes how one may eventually be able to detect (distinguish) wormholes, suggesting they may have never been observed because they appear very similar to black holes.
  - Notable software developments:
    - After domain seizures of Z-Library by copyright law enforcement and moves toward dark web and IPFS technologies by its content providers, the open source shadow library UI Anna's Archive – which also provides access to a full copy of Z-Library content and scientific articles – is established by a team of archivists, essentially providing the largest human book and literature library.
    - News outlets report about the development of a post-editing model using GPT-3 that improves machine translations after identification of current translation problems (8 Nov/25 Oct).
    - The largest global inventory and interactive map of greenhouse gas emission sources is released by Climate TRACE (9 Nov).
    - Around the acquisition of Twitter by Elon Musk (27 Oct), interest in alternatives to the site – described as "one of the world's most high-profile information ecosystems", a contemporary suboptimal public square, and as heavily used by many journalists and news media – increases substantially. However, no alternative such as Mastodon, Reddit or the Bluesky protocol was found to match its features such as ease of use to date, in terms of being able to substitute the site.
    - Two studies demonstrate platform-built-in as well browser-integrated misinformation mitigation (11 Nov).
    - Researchers develop falsity scores for over 800 contemporary elites on Twitter and associated exposure scores (21 Nov).
    - News outlets report about the first fully self-supervised anti–money laundering AI software using contemporary suboptimal datasets, LaundroGraph (24 Nov/26 Oct).
- 11 November – The Global Carbon Project reports that carbon emissions in 2022 remain at record levels, with no sign of the decrease that is needed to limit global warming to 1.5 °C. At the current rate, the carbon that can still be emitted while still meeting the 1.5 °C global goal will likely (at a 50% chance) be emitted within only around nine years.
- 12 November – Astronomers, using the Hubble Space Telescope, report the discovery of one of the most metal-poor galaxies known. This nearby dwarf galaxy, 20 million light-years away and 1,200 light-years across, is named HIPASS J1131–31 (nicknamed the "Peekaboo" galaxy).
- 14 November
  - Archaeologists report the oldest likely evidence (via heated fish teeth from a deep cave) of controlled use of fire to cook food by archaic humans ~780,000 years ago.
  - After being linked to risks for obesity, mental disorders, and potentially other health issues, a study finds a likely association between (contemporary types of) outdoor artificial light at night and diabetes.
- 15 November
  - A scientific review finds that human sperm counts fell by 62% in the last 50 years and are decreasing at an accelerating rate, likely a result of factors such as poor diets, endocrine disruptors in prevalent products, unhealthy lifestyles and toxic forever chemicals in air and water.
  - A study using neuroimaging identifies rapid GABA boosting as a major potential explanation-component for why learning is often more efficient in children.
  - Scientists report leprosy-causing bacteria viably regenerate and rejuvenate the liver in its armadillos hosts, which may enable novel human therapies.
- 16 November
  - NASA conducts the first uncrewed flight of its Space Launch System (SLS), the largest rocket in history. The onboard Orion capsule will orbit the Moon before returning to Earth, as a demonstration of planned human missions.
  - A satellite-free GPS-alternative higher-resolution positioning system using existing telecommunications networks is demonstrated, SuperGPS.

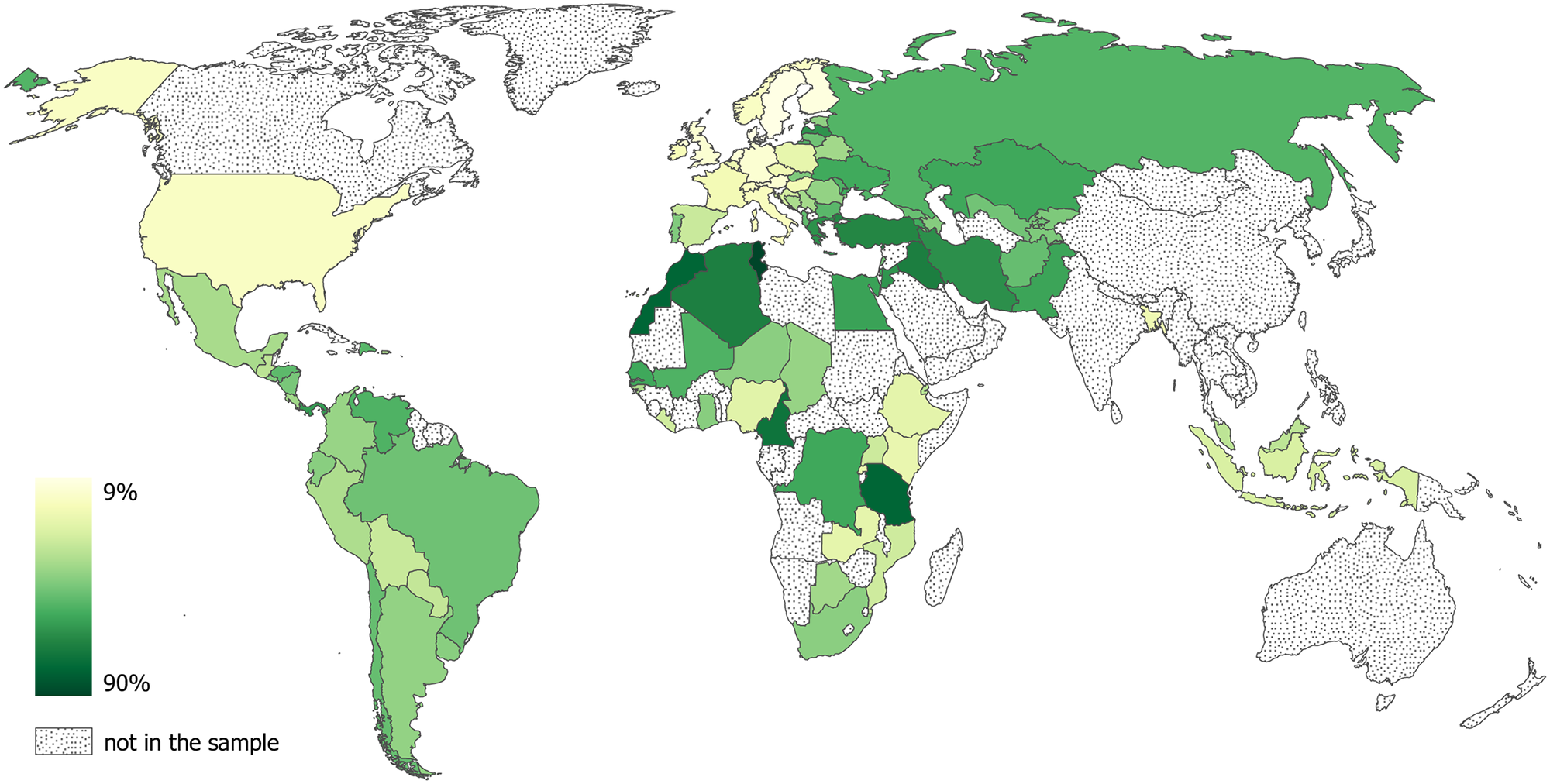
23 November: A study reports estimated contemporary prevalence and associations with belief in witchcraft around the world, which (in their data) varied between 9% and 90% between nations and is still a widespread element in worldviews globally.

- 18 November – Researchers theorize that in many disciplines, larger scientific productivity or success by elite universities can be explained by their larger pool of available funded laborers. A commentary notes that academic rankings don't consider where (country and institute) the respective researchers were trained (1 Dec).
- 19 November – Researchers report determinants of alertness after waking up.
- 21 November
  - Scientists in Papua New Guinea record the black-naped pheasant pigeon for the first time in 140 years.
  - A GBD study reports the first global estimates of death rates from (33) bacterial pathogens, finding such infections are contributing to one in 8 deaths (or ~7.7 million deaths), which could make it the second largest cause of death globally in 2019.
  - A pulsed electric field-based shark and ray bycatch mitigation device is reported, SharkGuard.
- 22 November
  - The International Bureau of Weights and Measures announces it will phase out the leap second by 2035.
  - Photochemistry is confirmed on an exoplanet for the first time, as the James Webb Space Telescope detects a range of signatures including sulfur dioxide in the atmosphere of WASP-39b.
  - A cohort study indicates dietary intakes of total flavonols – and at least kaempferol- and quercetin-containing foods in specific – may substantially decrease decline in multiple cognitive abilities with older age, showing a difference of "0.4 units per decade" between 5 mg and 15 mg intakes.
- 23 November
  - Acoustic Nanoscale Separation via Wave-pillar Excitation Resonance (ANSWER) is demonstrated as a way of separating nanoparticles, especially small extracellular vesicles, from biofluids in under 10 minutes.
  - A study reports phages have a large variety of CRISPR-Cas systems. They possibly may use them to edit hosts' genes and for competitive advantages, e.g. against rival phages. These systems could be useful for CRISPR-Cas gene editing.
  - A study reports estimated contemporary prevalence and associations with belief in witchcraft around the world, which (in their data) varied between 9% and 90% between nations and is still a widespread element in worldviews globally. It also shows associations such as with low "innovative activity", lower life expectancy and high religiosity.
  - Geneticists report that the fastest-evolved regions of the human genome, they call HAQERs, "rapidly diverged in an episodic burst" of positive selection prior to the human-Neanderthal split and identify over 1,500 such HAQERs that substantially distinguish humans from related other apes via datasets such as of HARs and experiments that use embryonic mouse brains.
- 24 November
  - Promising results of therapeutic candidates are reported:
    a universal flu mRNA vaccine, a phase 3 trialed RSV vaccine (1 Nov), phase 3 trialed antibiotic gepotidacin against UTIs (3 Nov), phase I trialed new antibiotic for gram-negative bacteria QPX9003 (20 Oct/9 Nov), phase 2 trialed antibody CIS43LS against malaria (17 Nov), phase 2 trialed acoziborole against African sleeping sickness parasites (29 Nov), and phase 3 trialed lecanemab against Alzheimer's disease (29 Nov).
  - A new CRISPR-Cas9 gene editing tool for large edits without problematic double-stranded breaks is demonstrated, PASTE.
- 29 November
  - Canadian mineralogists discover two new minerals, Elkinstantonite and Elaliite, on the 15-tonne El Ali meteorite that grounded in Somalia.
  - A study maps common disease combinations or multimorbidity patterns, a "growing public health problem worldwide".
- 30 November
  - An electrolysis system for viable hydrogen production from seawater without requiring a pre-desalination process, which could make it less flexible and more costly, is reported.
  - A study deploying protein imaging of adult mice suggests adult brains contain, at the tips of filopodia, many (~30% of all dendritic protrusions) "silent synapses" that are inactive until recruited as part of neural plasticity and flexible learning or memories, previously thought to be present mainly in the developing pre-adult brain and to die off with time.
  - Scientists develop a quantum experiment allowing the observation of a kind of theoretical wormhole in a SYK "baby" physical model which some, but not all, consider potentially useful for the development of quantum gravity theories.

=== December ===
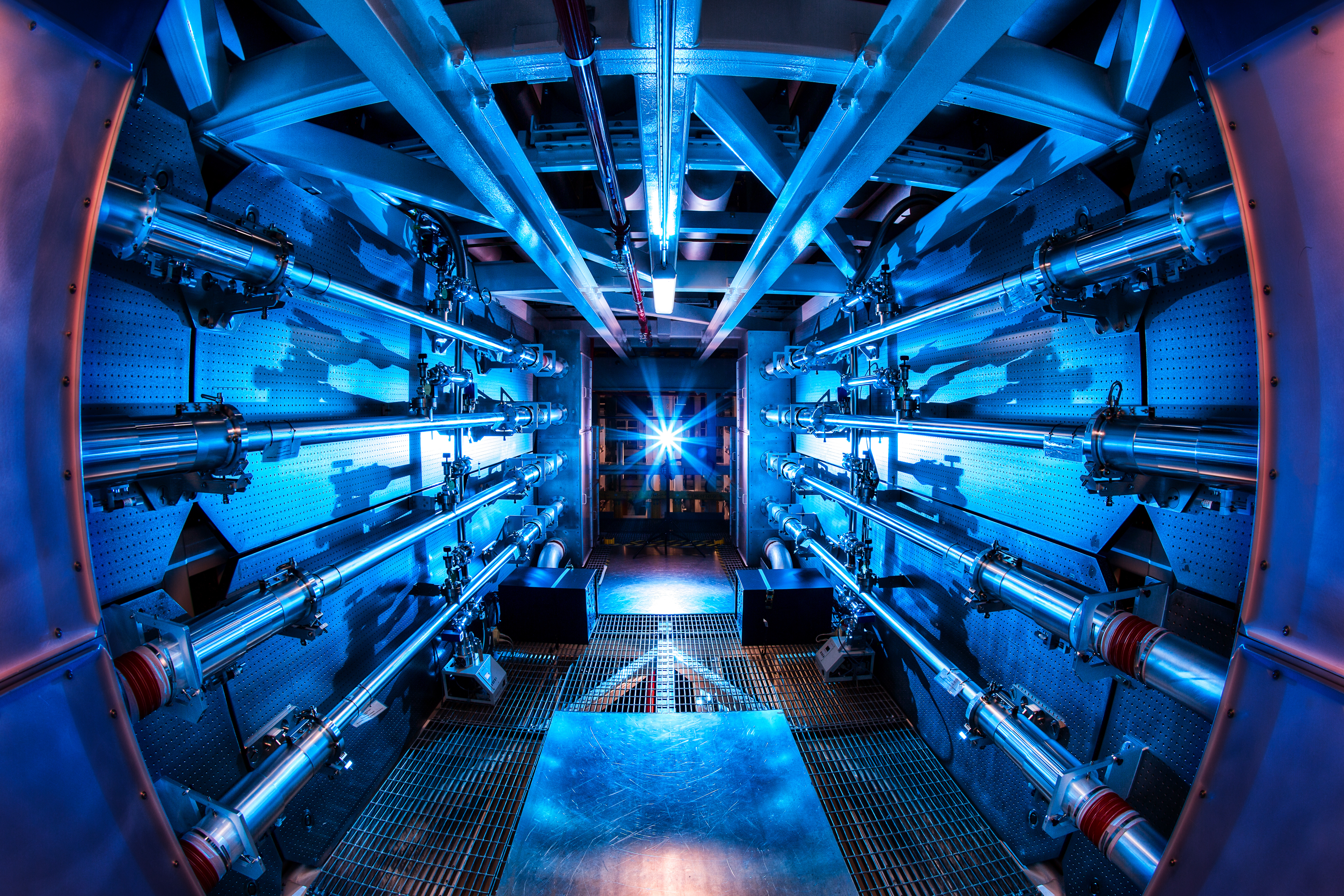
13 December: Net energy gain in fusion power is reported at the National Ignition Facility.

- 1 December
  - Astronomers using the James Webb Space Telescope report viewing clouds, likely made of methane, moving across Saturn's moon Titan.
  - Genomic epidemiologists report results from a global survey of antimicrobial resistance (AMR) via genomic wastewater-based epidemiology, finding large regional variations, providing maps, and suggesting resistance genes are also passed on between microbial species that are not closely related. On 9 December, the WHO's fifth GLASS report summarizes 2020 data on inter-national AMR, including various new features and an interactive dashboard.
  - Scientists report the measurement of the highest toughness ever recorded, of any material, while investigating a metallic alloy made of chromium, cobalt, and nickel.
- 4 December – Chemical engineers report a method to substantially increase conversion efficiency and reduce material costs of green hydrogen production by using sound waves during electrolysis.
- 5 December
  - Construction begins on the Square Kilometer Array, the largest telescope in history.
  - A review summarizes current scientific data about cardiovascular health effects of a large number of dietary supplements and micronutrients, including with a heat map visualizing evidence quality and health impact direction of each.
  - Health/eco-economics:
    - A study projects the costs of inaction on physical inactivity in terms of number of cases of preventable major NCDs and healthcare system finances.
    - Results of a trial investigating financial incentives for health, in particular for weight loss, are reported (5 Dec).
    - Researchers provide first estimates of global costs of inadequate pollination (14 Dec).
    - Results of a trial on effects of climate change impact menu labels on fast food ordering choices (27 Dec).

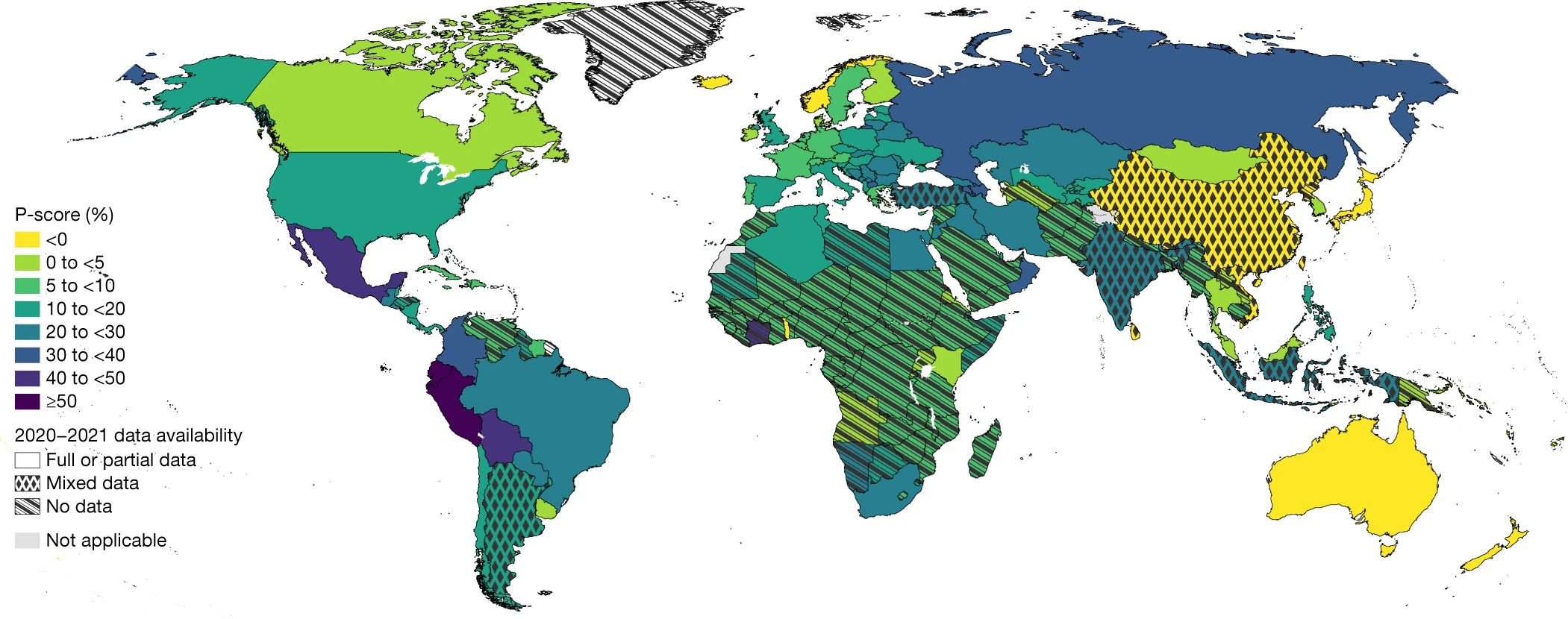
14 December: A WHO study comprehensively estimates excess deaths from the COVID-19 pandemic during 2020 and 2021, concluding ~14.8 million excess early deaths occurred

- 6 December
  - Scientists provide a mechanistic biological explanation for why upper respiratory tract infections are more prevalent in the cold or winter season, previously largely explained only by behavioral and environmental variations. They found cold exposure impairs extracellular vesicle (EV) swarm–mediated antiviral immunity in the nose – fewer EVs are secreted and they become less effective.
  - Impossible Metals announces its first underwater robotic vehicle, 'Eureka 1', has completed its first trial of selectively harvesting polymetallic nodule rocks from the seabed nearly without harming the environment (as with other seabed mining) to help address the rising global need for metals for renewable energy system components, mainly batteries.
  - Researchers propose "significantly increasing freshwater through the capture of humid air over oceans" to address present and, especially, future water scarcity/insecurity.
  - Emulate researchers assess advantages of using liver-chips predicting drug-induced liver injury which could reduce the high costs and time needed in drug development workflows/pipelines, sometimes described as the pharmaceutical industry's "productivity crisis".
- 7 December
  - Scientists report that two-million years old genetic material was found in Greenland, and is currently considered the oldest DNA discovered so far.
  - Scientists propose a new supergroup of eukaryotes, termed Provora – predators of other microorganisms which have been overlooked due to numerical rarity.
- 8 December
  - Astronomers report in a preprint the possible detection of the earliest first stars, technically referred to as Population III stars.
  - In a paywalled article, American scientists propose policy-based measures to reduce large risks from life sciences research – such as pandemics through accident or misapplication. Risk management measures may include novel international guidelines, effective oversight, improvement of US policies to influence policies globally, and identification of gaps in biosecurity policies along with potential approaches to address them.
- 9 December
  - Researchers report the development of a blood test, SOBA, for Alzheimer's screening via levels of toxic amyloid beta oligomers with sensitivity and specificity of apparently 99%. On 27 December, a separate study reports another well-performing blood test to detect Alzheimer's disease via biomarker brain-derived tau.
  - Anti-aging research:
    - A study indicates that aging shifts activity toward short genes or shorter transcript length and that this can be countered by interventions.
    - A paywalled study reports higher percentage of daily energy consumption of ultra-processed foods, such as white bread or instant noodles, was associated with faster cognitive decline in aging. Differences can be as large or larger than a 28% faster rate of global cognitive decline (5 Dec).
    - Scientists report that sphingolipids accumulate in muscle during aging whose genetic inhibition or ceramide-blockers such as myriocin could counteract, reducing associated muscle loss (16 Dec).
    - By stimulating (or charging) genetically engineered roundworm mitochondria with light, researchers show that halting the decline in mitochondrial membrane potential can slow aging (30 Dec).
  - Researchers report the development of 3D-printed flexible paper-thin organic photovoltaics.
- 12 December – Scientists describe a new method to break up so-called "forever chemicals" by infusing contaminated water with hydrogen, then blasting it with high-energy, short-wavelength ultraviolet light.
- 13 December
  - The Newborn Genomes Programme is announced by the UK government. It will conduct whole genome sequencing of 100,000 newborns, the largest study of its kind in the world, to aid research into the diagnosis and treatment of rare genetic conditions.
  - In a major milestone for the field, scientists at the National Ignition Facility report a net energy gain in the development of fusion power.
  - COVID-19 pandemic: A study finds that the BQ and XBB subvariants of SARS-CoV-2 are "barely susceptible to neutralization" by vaccines, including the new Omicron boosters. Key antibody drugs, Evusheld and bebtelovimab, are "completely inactive" against the new subvariants. This could result in a surge of breakthrough infections and reinfections, according to the study team, although the vaccines hold up against severe disease.
  - A study systematically assesses advice given by professional general practitioners, typically in the form of verbal-only consultation, for weight-loss to obese patients. They found it rarely included effective methods, was mostly generic, and was rarely tailored to patients' existing knowledge and behaviours.
- 14 December
  - A WHO study comprehensively estimates excess deaths from the COVID-19 pandemic during 2020 and 2021, concluding ~14.8 million excess early deaths occurred, reaffirming their prior calculations from May as well as updating them, addressing criticisms. These numbers do not include measures like years of potential life lost, far exceed the 5.42 million officially reported deaths, may make COVID-19 2021's leading cause of death, and are similar to the ~18 million estimated by another study.
  - Microbiome research:
    - Researchers report the discovery of a gut–brain connection in mice that regulates motivation for exercise and can enhance performance by augmenting dopamine signalling during physical activity.
    - A microbiome-wide association study associates thirteen microbial taxa with depressive symptoms (6 Dec).
    - Scientists report that and how – including transfer of mobile genetic elements and infant diet – the maternal microbiome shapes offspring gut microbiomes as fetus and infant (22 Dec).
  - A first global review summarizes scarce data on a likely largely declining "experience of nature" and nature-disconnection which prior studies suggest have impacts on health and proenvironmental behavior.
  - A university reports on the first study (25 Oct) of the new privacy-intrusion Web tracking technique of "UID smuggling" by the ad industry, which finds it to be prevalent and largely not mitigated by latest protection tools – such as Firefox's tracking protection and uBlock Origin – and contributes to countermeasures.
- 15 December
  - Astronomers find that a pair of exoplanets orbiting the red dwarf star Kepler-138 are likely to be water worlds.
  - News reports about the development (22 Oct) in China of an edible, plant-based ink derived from food waste, which could be used in 3D printing of scaffolds to reduce the cost of cultured meat.
  - Promising results of therapeutic candidates are reported:
    phase 2-trialed talquetamab against multiple myeloma (10&15 Dec), a phase 1-trialed HIV vaccine (2 Dec), mice-tested Pillar[6]MaxQ against meth and fentanyl drug overdoses (15 Dec), first approval of a trialed honeybee vaccine against American foulbrood (29 Dec), a mice-tested triple combination therapy against pancreatic cancer of immunotherapy medications undergoing trials as monotherapies (30 Dec).
- 19 December – A new world record solar cell efficiency for a silicon-perovskite tandem solar cell is achieved, with scientists in Germany converting 32.5% of sunlight into electrical energy.
- 20 December – OpenAI releases Point-E, a machine learning system that can generate 3D models from text prompts (text-to-3D), similar to previously released GET3D and Magic3D by Nvidia and DreamFusion by Google.
- 22 December
  - A network model analysis suggests that temporary overshoots of climate change – increasing global temperature beyond Paris Agreement goals temporarily as often projected – can increase risks of climate tipping cascades "by up to 72%".
  - In a paywalled article, scientists provide 3D imaging and model analysis to reveal main causes, mechanics, and potential mitigations of the problematic prevalent lithium-ion battery degradation over charge cycles.
- 26 December – Bio- and electrical engineers prove for the first time that human cerebral organoids transplanted into mice functionally integrate with their visual cortex.
- 27 December – Scientists report that a species of Halteria, a single-celled protozoan, is the first known organism for which "a virus-only diet ... is enough to fuel the physiological growth and even population growth".

== Awards ==
- 5 July – The Fields Medal in mathematics is awarded to Hugo Duminil-Copin, June Huh, James Maynard and Maryna Viazovska.
- 2 December – Winners of the Earthshot Prize are announced, established in 2021 and awarded for developments useful for international climate change mitigation and sustainability goals.

== Deaths ==
- 18 January – Sir David Cox, English statistician (b. 1924)
- 15 March – Eugene Parker, American solar and plasma physicist (b. 1927)
- 20 March – Wen Shengchang, Chinese oceanographer and member of the Chinese Academy of Sciences (b. 1921)
- 23 March – Arthur Riggs, American geneticist (b. 1939)
- 27 March – Martin Pope, American physical scientist (b. 1918)
- 27 March – James Vaupel, American demographer and aging researcher (b. 1945)
- 29 March – Paul Benioff, American physicist of quantum computing (b. 1930)
- 30 March – Kenneth Walters, British mathematician and rheologist (b. 1934)
- 1 April – Gerhard J. Woeginger, Austrian mathematician.
- 5 April – Sidney Altman, Canadian-American molecular biologist, Nobel Prize laureate (1989).
- 5 April – Bjarni Tryggvason, Icelandic-born Canadian astronaut (STS-85).
- 5 April – Eelco Visser, Dutch computer scientist.
- 5 April – Leslie Young, New Zealand economist.
- 1 May – Ray Freeman, British chemist.
- 1 May – Dominique Lecourt, French philosopher.
- 2 May – Joseph Raz, Israeli philosopher.
- 4 May – Amanda Claridge, Canadian archaeologist.
- 7 May – Sir Paul Mellars, British archaeologist.
- 8 May – Harry Dornbrand, American aerospace engineer.
- 8 May – Zhuang Qiaosheng, Chinese geneticist and wheat breeder, member of the Chinese Academy of Sciences.
- 9 May – John H. Coates, Australian mathematician.
- 14 May – Bernard Bigot, French physicist and civil servant, director general of ITER (b. 1950)
- 9 June – Gordon M. Shepherd, American neuroscientist.
- 26 July – James Lovelock, English environmentalist (Gaia hypothesis) and futurist (b. 1919)
- 25 August – Kurt Gottfried, Austrian-born American physicist.
- 2 September – Frank Drake, American astronomer and astrophysicist (Drake equation), designer of the Arecibo message (b. 1930)
- 9 December – Ademar José Gevaerd, Brazilian ufologist (b. 1962)

== See also ==
- 2020s#Global goals and issues
- Category:Science events
- Category:Science timelines
- List of emerging technologies
- List of years in science
