= 1927 in science =

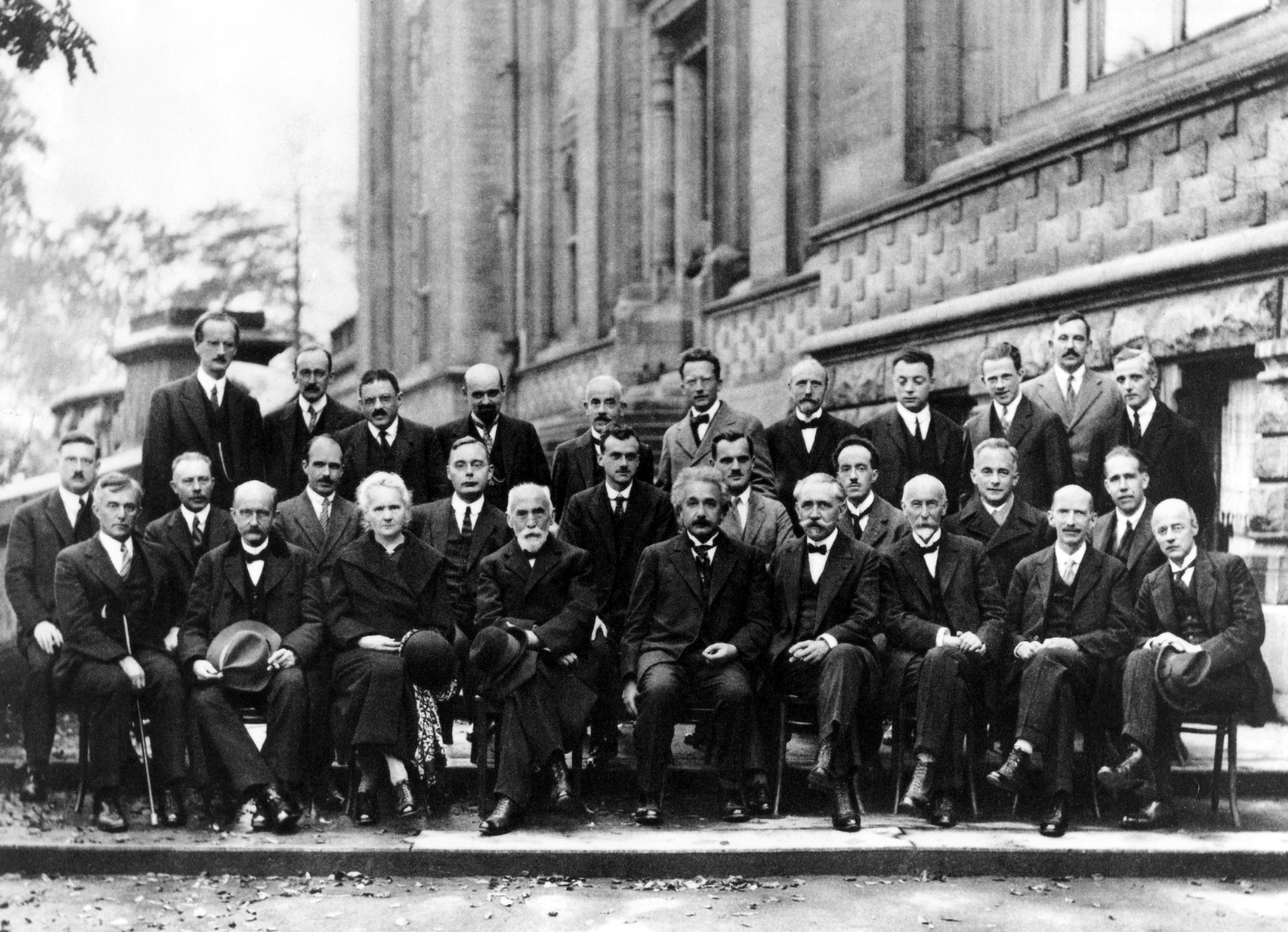
Solvay Conference on Quantum Mechanics

The year 1927 in science and technology involved some significant events, listed below.

== Astronomy and astrophysics ==
- Edward Emerson Barnard's A Photographic Atlas of Selected Regions of the Milky Way is published posthumously.

== Botany ==
- The Cholodny-Went model of tropism in emerging monocotyledon shoots is first proposed by Nikolai Cholodny of the University of Kiev.

== Chemistry ==
- Fritz London and Walter Heitler apply quantum mechanics to explain covalent bonding in the hydrogen molecule, which marks the birth of quantum chemistry.
- Amphetamine is synthesized (for a second time) by American chemist Gordon Alles and reported to have sympathomimetic properties.

== Environment ==
- Carbon emissions from fossil fuel burning and industry reach one billion tonnes per year.

== Genetics ==
- American biologist Raymond Pearl publishes an influential attack on the basic assumptions of eugenics.

== Mathematics ==
- Publication of the 2nd edition of Principia Mathematica by Alfred North Whitehead and Bertrand Russell, one of the most important and seminal works in mathematical logic and philosophy.

== Medicine ==
- António Egas Moniz develops cerebral angiography.

== Microbiology ==
- Ronald Canti's ground-breaking stop-motion cinematic technique vividly illustrates the microscopic behaviour of normal and neoplastic cells: irradiation is shown to cause immobilisation and mitotic arrest in suspensions of cells.

== Physics ==
- February 23 – German theoretical physicist Werner Heisenberg writes a letter to fellow physicist Wolfgang Pauli in which he describes his uncertainty principle for the first time.
- April – Abbé Georges Lemaître publishes in the Annales de la Société Scientifique de Bruxelles "Un Univers homogène de masse constante et de rayon croissant rendant compte de la vitesse radiale des nébuleuses extra-galactiques" proposing the theory of the expansion of the Universe, deriving what will become known as Hubble's law, making the first estimation of what will become called the Hubble constant, and proposing what becomes known as the Big Bang theory of the origin of the Universe, which he calls his 'hypothesis of the primeval atom'.
- April 16 – Publication of the key result of the Davisson–Germer experiment (concluded this year), confirming wave–particle duality.
- September – Niels Bohr introduces the principle of complementarity during the Como Conference
- October – The fifth Solvay Conference meets in Brussels to discuss the newly formulated quantum mechanics. Albert Einstein attacks the theories of Niels Bohr and Werner Heisenberg.

== Technology ==
- August 2 – American electrical engineer Harold Stephen Black invents the negative-feedback amplifier.
- September 7 – Philo Farnsworth's electronic image dissector television camera tube transmits its first image at his laboratory at 202 Green Street in San Francisco.
- November 5 – Completion of a bridge by Westinghouse Electric and Manufacturing in Turtle Creek, Pennsylvania, the world's first railroad bridge of wholly welded construction.
- Date unknown
  - Emil Lerp invents the transportable gasoline chainsaw.
  - Vibraphone developed in its modern form by Henry Schluter of J.C. Deagan, Inc. in the United States.

== Zoology ==
- Last known specimens of the Syrian wild ass die.

== Awards ==
- Nobel Prizes
  - Physics – Arthur Holly Compton, Charles Thomson Rees Wilson
  - Chemistry – Heinrich Otto Wieland
  - Medicine – Julius Wagner-Jauregg
- Copley Medal: Charles Sherrington
- Wollaston Medal for Geology: William Whitehead Watts

== Births ==
- January 13 – Sydney Brenner (died 2019) South African-born molecular biologist; recipient of Nobel Prize in Physiology or Medicine.
- January 29 – Lewis Urry (died 2004), Canadian inventor of the long-lasting alkaline battery.
- March 9 – Julian Tudor Hart (died 2018), British physician.
- March 16 – Vladimir Komarov (died 1967), Russian cosmonaut on Soyuz 1.
- April 4 – Frederick I. Ordway III (died 2014), American space scientist.
- April 10 – Marshall Warren Nirenberg (died 2010), American biochemist and geneticist; recipient of Nobel Prize in Physiology or Medicine.
- April 18 – Nicole Grasset (died 2009), Swiss-French medical virologist and microbiologist-epidemiologist.
- April 19 – Martin Wood (died 2021), English applied physicist.
- April 26 – Anne McLaren (died 2007), English developmental biologist.
- April 29 – Walter Thirring (died 2014), Austrian mathematical physicist.
- May 26 – Endel Tulving,(died 2023) ,Estonian-Canadian experimental psychologist, cognitive neuroscientist.
- June 10 – Eugene Parker (died 2022), American solar astrophysicist.
- June 21 – Ye Shuhua, Chinese astronomer.
- June 22 – Karl Schügerl (died 2018), Hungarian chemical engineer.
- July 2 – R. J. G. Savage (died 1998), Northern Ireland-born palaeontologist.
- July 29 – Gerald Westbury (died 2014), English cancer surgeon.
- August 2 – Gabriel Horn (died 2012), English biologist.
- August 9 – Marvin Minsky (died 2016), American computer scientist, pioneer of artificial intelligence.
- September 4 – John McCarthy (died 2011), American computer scientist and cognitive scientist.
- September 15 – Ricardo Miledi (died 2017), Mexican neuroscientist
- September 29 – Edith Eger (died 2026), Czech-born American psychologist
- October 27 – Mikhail Postnikov (died 2004), Soviet mathematician, known for his work in algebraic and differential topology.
- November 12 – Yutaka Taniyama (suicide 1958), Japanese mathematician.
- November 13 – Billy Klüver (died 2004), Swedish-American engineer, co-founded Experiments in Art and Technology
- November 20 – Kikuo Takano (died 2006), Japanese poet and mathematician.
- November 27 – Arnold Clark (died 2017), Scottish inventor.
- December 9 – Ralph Kohn (died 2016), German-born British medical scientist
- December 23 – Edith Irby Jones, born Edith Mae Irby (died 2019), African American physician.
- December 27 – George Streisinger (died 1984), Hungarian-born molecular biologist, first person to clone a vertebrate.

== Deaths ==
- January 19 – Carl Gräbe (born 1841), German chemist.
- February 9 – Charles Walcott (born 1850), American paleontologist.
- March 4 – Ira Remsen (born 1846), American chemist.
- March 27 – William Healey Dall (born 1845), American malacologist and explorer.
- May 2 – Ernest Starling (born 1866), English physiologist.
- August 3 – Edward B. Titchener (born 1867), American structuralist psychologist.
- August 13 – James Oliver Curwood (born 1887), American novelist and conservationist.
- September 14 – Julian Sochocki (born 1842), Polish-born mathematician.
- October 2 – Svante Arrhenius (born 1859), Swedish winner of the Nobel Prize in Chemistry.
- November 11 – Wilhelm Johannsen (born 1857), Danish plant physiologist and geneticist.
- December 2 – Paul Heinrich von Groth (born 1843), German mineralogist.
- December 24 – Vladimir Bekhterev (born 1857), Russian psychologist.
