= Kobuvirus =

Virus classification
- (unranked): Virus
- Realm: Riboviria
- Kingdom: Orthornavirae
- Phylum: Pisuviricota
- Class: Pisoniviricetes
- Order: Picornavirales
- Family: Picornaviridae
- Genus: Kobuvirus

Genus of viruses

Kobuvirus is a genus of viruses in the order Picornavirales, in the family Picornaviridae. Humans and cattle serve as natural hosts. There are six species in this genus. Diseases associated with this genus include: gastroenteritis. The genus was named because of the virus particles' lumpy appearance by electron microscopy; "kobu" means "knob" in Japanese.

Three species of the genus include Aichivirus A (formerly Aichi virus), Aichivirus B (formerly Bovine kobuvirus) and Aichivirus C (formerly Porcine kobuvirus) each possessing a single serotype. Canine kobuvirus belong to species Aichivirus A. Aichi virus infects humans, while bovine kobuvirus, porcine kobuvirus and canine kobuvirus, as suggested by their names, infects cattle, swine, dogs and cats.

In 2014 a novel caprine kobuvirus was characterised after isolation from a Korean black goat.

Nucleic acid sequence analysis and RT-PCR are used prevalently as detection and genotyping methods of kobuvirus although, there are some other techniques such as EM, and ELISA.

== Taxonomy ==
The genus contains the following species:

- Aichivirus A
- Aichivirus B
- Aichivirus C
- Aichivirus D
- Aichivirus E
- Aichivirus F

== Virus particles ==
Viruses in Kobuvirus are non-enveloped, with icosahedral and spherical geometries, and T=pseudo3 symmetry. The diameter is around 30 nm. Genomes are linear and non-segmented, around 8.25kb in length. The molecular mass of a typical virion particle of this genus is typically eight to nine million. The virions of the viruses in this genus consist of capsids that are 27 to 30 nm in diameter. The capsid is believed to consist of 12 capsomers and the capsid shell structure of these virions has a monolayer composition. Using conventional electron microscopy, the structure of the capsid surface can be visualized. The virus particles contain a single species of ssRNA. These virions have a sedimentation coefficient of 140–165 S20w. The particles are described to be “relatively stable” in vitro (in comparison to other viruses) and stable in acidic conditions of pH 3.5. They have also been found to be insensitive to treatment with some chemicals including chloroform, ether and non-ionic detergents.

Genus	Structure	Symmetry	Capsid	Genomic arrangement	Genomic segmentation
Kobuvirus	Icosahedral	Pseudo T=3	Non-enveloped	Linear	Monopartite

== Life cycle ==
Viral replication is cytoplasmic. Entry into the host cell is achieved by attachment of the virus to host receptors, which mediates endocytosis. Replication follows the positive stranded RNA virus replication model. Positive stranded RNA virus transcription is the method of transcription. The virus exits the host cell by lysis, and viroporins. Human and cattle serve as the natural host. Transmission routes are fecal–oral.

Genus	Host details	Tissue tropism	Entry details	Release details	Replication site	Assembly site	Transmission
Kobuvirus	Humans	None	Cell receptor endocytosis	Lysis	Cytoplasm	Cytoplasm	Oral–fecal; blood

== Genetics ==
The viruses in this genus have single-stranded, linear non-segmented, positive-sense RNA genomes with lengths of approximately 8.2–8.3 kb.
