= Wastewater-based epidemiology =

Epidemiological instrument for finding substances

Wastewater-based epidemiology (or wastewater-based surveillance or sewage chemical-information mining) analyzes wastewater to determine the consumption of, or exposure to, chemicals or pathogens in a population. This is achieved by measuring chemical or biomarkers in wastewater generated by the people contributing to a sewage treatment plant catchment. Wastewater-based epidemiology has been used to estimate illicit drug use in communities or populations, but can be used to measure the consumption of alcohol, caffeine, various pharmaceuticals and other compounds. Wastewater-based epidemiology has also been adapted to measure the load of pathogens such as SARS-CoV-2 in a community. It differs from traditional drug testing, urine or stool testing in that results are population-level rather than individual level. Wastewater-based epidemiology is an interdisciplinary endeavour that draws on input from specialists such as wastewater treatment plant operators, analytical chemists, molecular biologists and epidemiologists.

== History ==
Wastewater-based epidemiology (WBE) can be applied in the field of research that uses the analysis of sewage and wastewater to monitor the presence, distribution, and prevalence of a disease or chemicals in communities. The technique has been used for several decades, and an example of its early application is in the 1940s when WBE was applied for the detection and distribution of poliovirus in the sewage of New York, Chicago, and other cities. Another early application came in 1954, in a study of schistosome of snails. Wastewater-based epidemiology thereafter spread to multiple countries. By the turn of the 21st century, numerous studies had adopted the technique. A 2005 study measured cocaine and its metabolite benzoylecgonine in water samples from the River Po in Italy.

Wastewater-based epidemiology is supported by government bodies such as the European Union Drugs Agency in Europe. Similar counterparts in other countries, such as the Australian Criminal Intelligence Commission in Australia and authorities in China use wastewater-based epidemiology to monitor drug use in their populations.

As of 2026, WBE had reached more than 4600 sites in 72 countries.

== Technique ==
Wastewater-based epidemiology is analogous to urinalysis on a community scale. Small molecule compounds consumed by an individual can be excreted in the urine and/or feces in the form of the unchanged parent compound or a metabolite. In communities with sewerage, this urine combines with other wastes including other individuals' urine as they travel to a municipal wastewater treatment plant. The wastewater is sampled at the plant's inlet, prior to treatment. This is typically done with autosampler devices that collect 24-hour flow or temporally composite samples. These samples contain biomarkers from all the people contributing to a catchment. Collected samples are sent to a laboratory, where analytical chemistry techniques (such as liquid chromatography-mass spectrometry) are used to quantify compounds of interest. These results can be expressed in per capita loads based on the volume of wastewater. Per capita daily consumption of a chemical of interest (e.g. a drug) is determined as

${{\frac{R \times F \times C}{P}}}$

where R is the concentration of a residue in a wastewater sample, F is the volume of wastewater that the sample represents, C is a correction factor which reflects the average mass and molar excretion fraction of a parent drug or a metabolite, and P is the number of people in a wastewater catchment. Variations or modifications may be made to C to account for other factors such as the degradation of a chemical during its transport in the sewer system.

For microbial surveillance, methods from molecular biology like PCR (qPCR and dPCR) and genetic sequencing are used. These methods are often highly susceptible to inhibition by various chemical substances commonly found in wastewater. Monitoring of inhibition or removal of these inhibitors is therefore recommended.

== Applications ==
Commonly detected chemicals include, but are not limited to the following;

- Cocaine
- Amphetamine
- Methamphetamine
- Methylone
- Ecstasy
- Heroin
- Alcohol
- Nicotine
- Caffeine
- Ketamine
- Opioids
- Antidepressants
- Antipsychotics
- Antimicrobials
- Antihistamines
- Artificial sweeteners

=== Temporal comparisons ===
By analyzing samples taken across different time points, day-to-day or longer-term trends can be assessed. This approach has illustrated trends such as increased consumption of alcohol and recreational drugs on weekends compared to weekdays. A temporal wastewater-based epidemiology study in Washington measured wastewater samples in Washington before, during and after cannabis legalisation. By comparing cannabis consumption in wastewater with sales of cannabis through legal outlets, the study showed that the opening of legal outlets led to a decrease in the market share of the illegal market.

=== Spatial comparisons ===
Differences in chemical consumption amongst different locations can be established when comparable methods are used to analyse wastewater samples from different locations. The European Monitoring Centre for Drugs and Drug Addiction conducts regular multi-city tests in Europe to estimate the consumption of illegal drugs. Data from these monitoring efforts are used alongside more traditional monitoring methods to understand geographical changes in drug consumption trends.

== Microbial surveillance ==
=== Virus surveillance ===
Sewage can also be tested for signatures of viruses excreted via feces, such as the enteroviruses poliovirus, aichivirus and coronavirus. Systematic wastewater surveillance programs for monitoring enteroviruses, namely poliovirus, were instituted as early as 1996 in Russia. Wastewater testing is recognised as an important tool for poliovirus surveillance by the WHO, especially in situations where mainstream surveillance methods are lacking, or where viral circulation or introduction is suspected. Wastewater-based epidemiology of viruses has the potential to inform on the presence of viral outbreaks when or where it is not suspected. A 2013 study of archived wastewater samples from the Netherlands found viral RNA of Aichivirus A in Dutch sewage samples dating back to 1987, two years prior to the first identification of Aichivirus A in Japan. During the COVID-19 pandemic, wastewater-based epidemiology using qPCR and/or RNA-Seq was used in various countries as a complementary method for assessing the load of COVID-19 and its variants in populations. Regular surveillance programs for monitoring SARS-Cov-2 in wastewater has been instituted in populations within countries such as Canada, UAE, China, Singapore, the Netherlands, Spain, Austria, Germany and the United States. In addition to surveillance of human wastewater, studies have also been conducted on livestock wastewater. A 2011 article reported findings of 11.8% of collected human wastewater samples and 8.6% of swine wastewater samples as positive of the pathogen Clostridioides difficile.

=== Applications against major outbreaks ===
As of August 2020, the WHO recognizes wastewater surveillance of SARS-CoV-2 as a potentially useful source of information on the prevalence and temporal trends of COVID-19 in communities, while highlighting that gaps in research such as viral shedding characteristics should be addressed. Such aggregative testing may have detected early cases. Studies show that wastewater-based epidemiology has the potential for an early warning system and monitoring for COVID-19 infections. This may prove particularly useful once large shares of regional populations are vaccinated or recovered and do not need to conduct rapid tests while in some cases being infectious nevertheless.

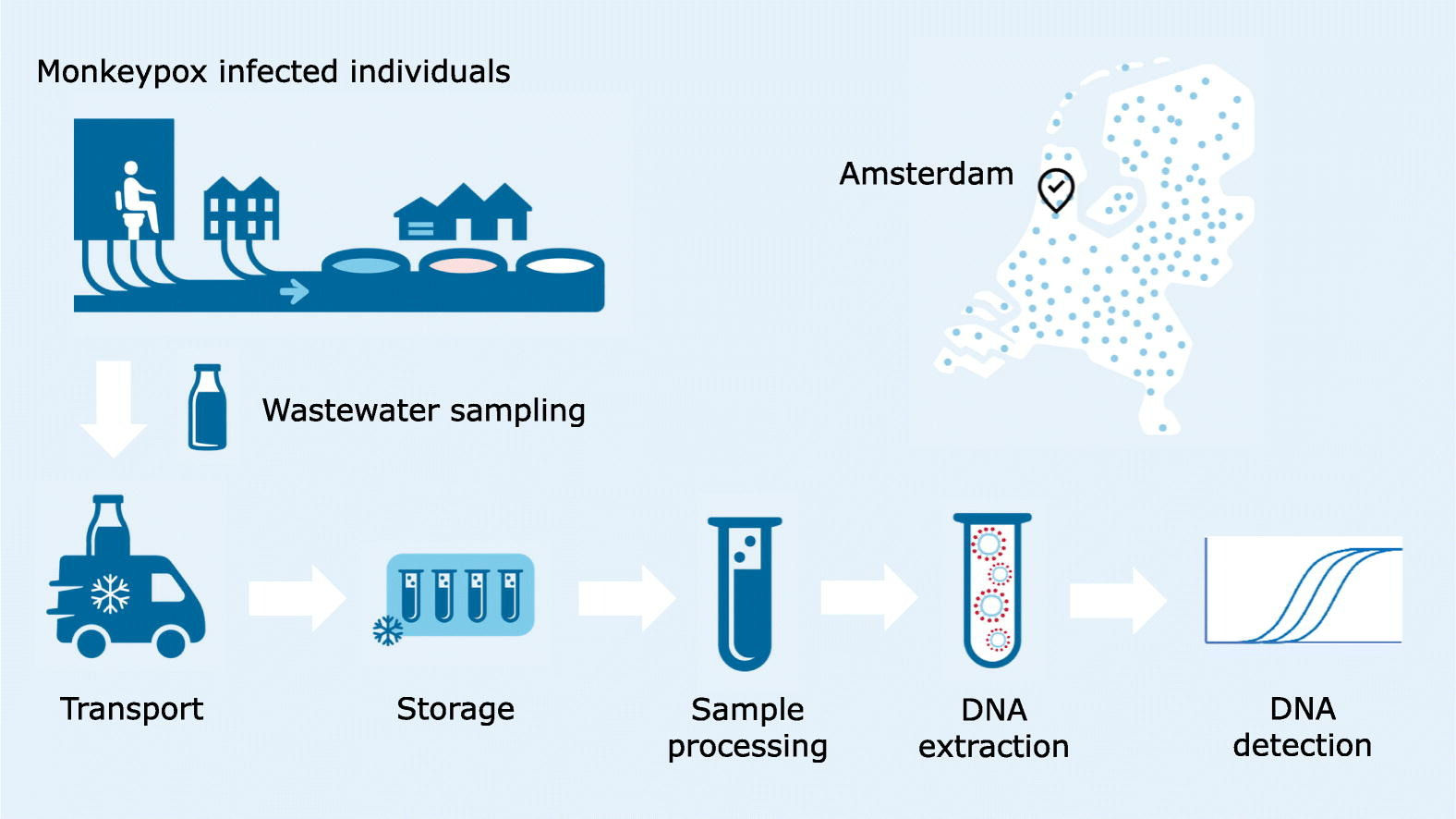
Rough workflow of detection of monkeypox virus DNA in wastewater samples in the Netherlands

Wastewater surveillance, which substantially expanded during the earlier COVID-19 pandemic was used to detect monkeypox in the 2022 monkeypox outbreak.

It is unclear how cost-effective wastewater surveillance is, but national coordination and standardized methods could be useful. Less common infections may be difficult to detect, including, such as those that cause hepatitis or foodborne illness. A warning of increased cases from wastewater surveillance can "provide health departments with critical lead time for making decisions about resource allocation and preventive measures" and "unlike testing of individual people, wastewater testing provides insights into the entire population within a catchment area".

A 2023 report by the National Academies of Sciences, Engineering and Medicine called for moving from the grass roots system that "sprung up in an ad hoc way, fueled by volunteerism and emergency pandemic-related funding" to a more standardized national system and suggested such a system "should be able to track a variety of potential threats, which could include future coronavirus variants, flu viruses, antibiotic resistant bacteria and entirely new pathogens".

=== Antimicrobial resistance ===
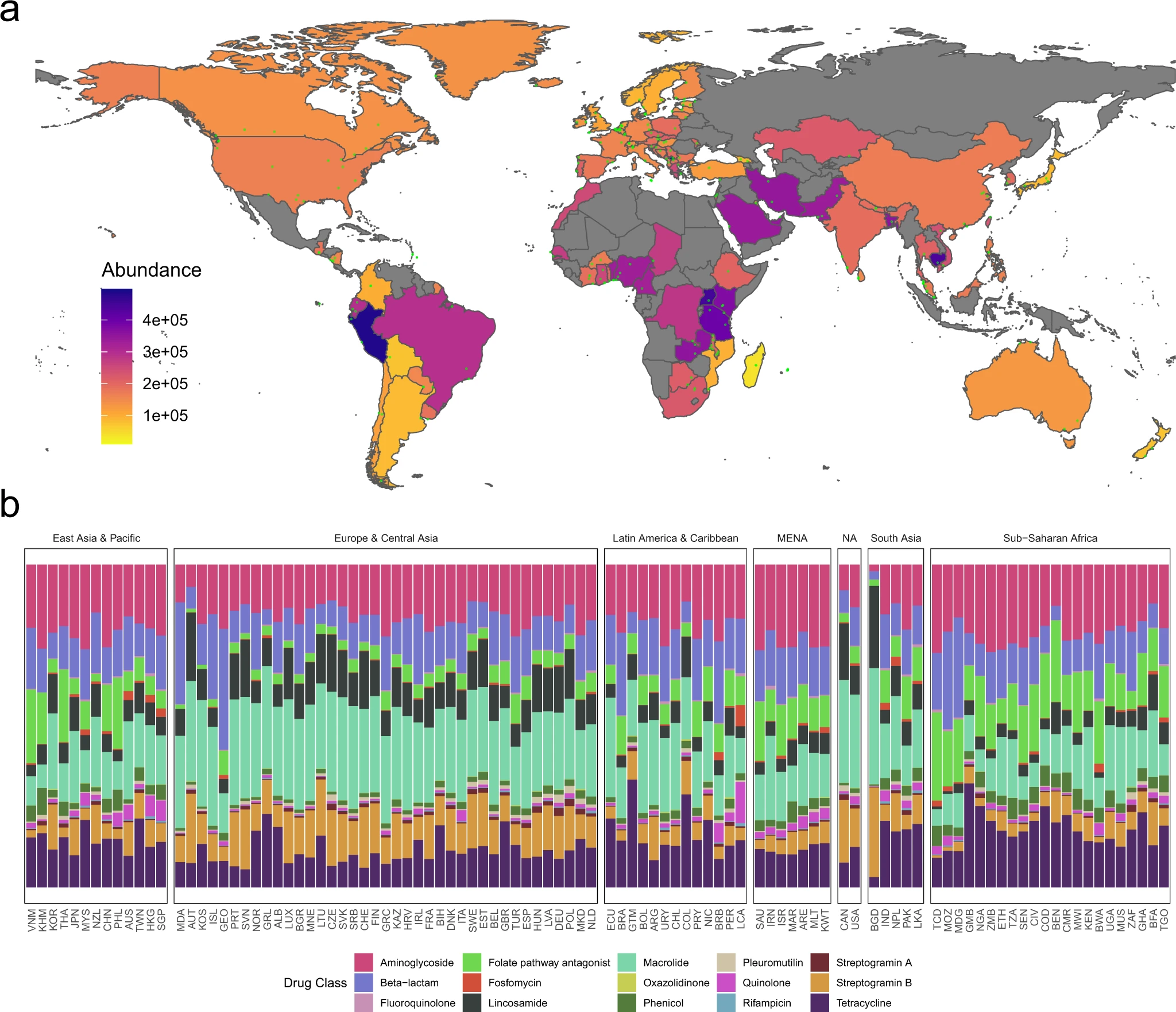
The global 'resistome' based on sewage-based monitoring

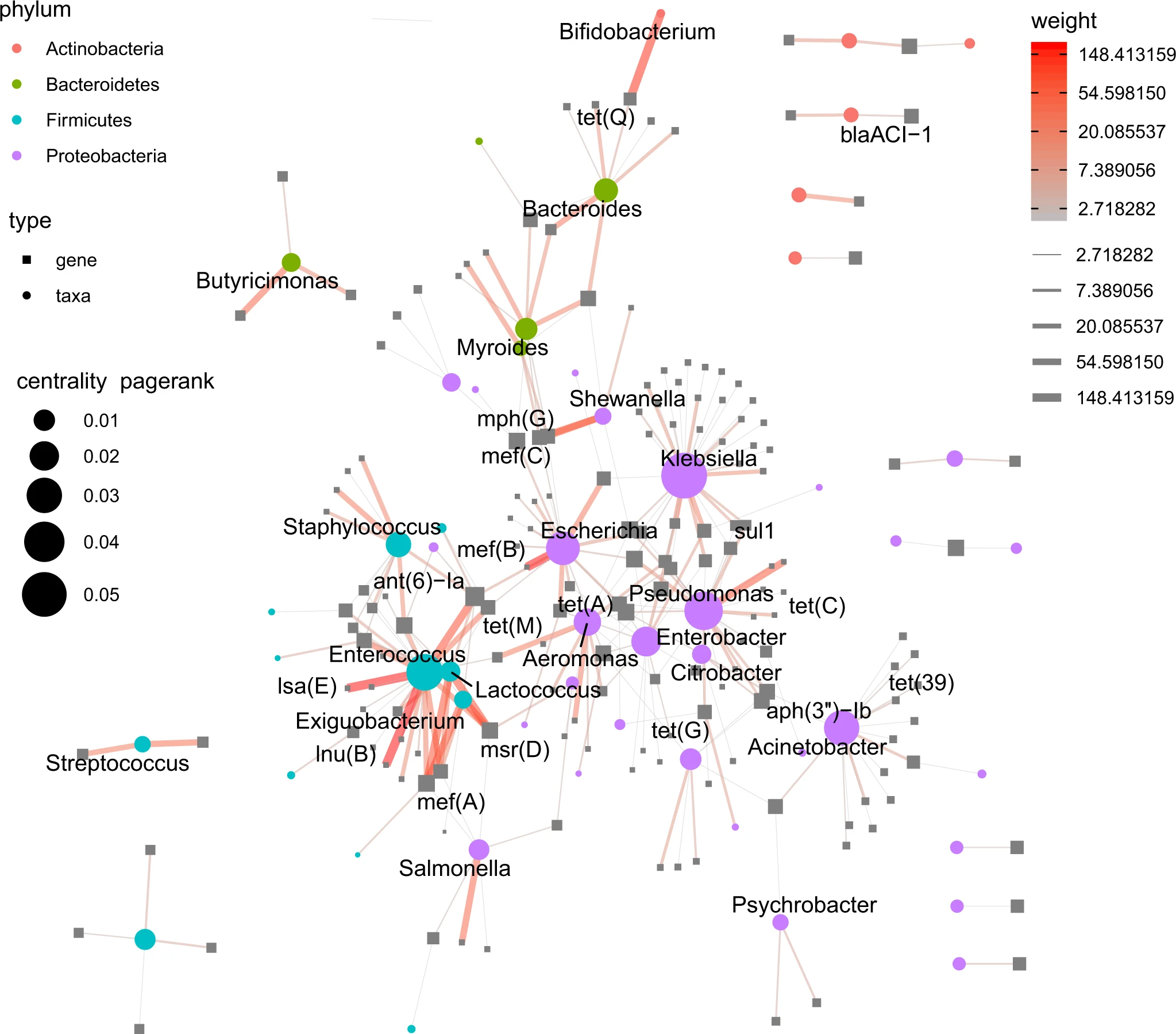
Gene-sharing network between bacterial genera

In 2022, genomic epidemiologists reported results from a global survey of antimicrobial resistance (AMR) via genomic wastewater-based epidemiology, finding large regional variations, providing maps, and suggesting resistance genes are also passed on between microbial species that are not closely related. A 2023 review on wastewater-based epidemiology opined the necessity of surveillance wastewater from farms with livestock, wet markets and surrounding areas given the greater risk of pathogen spillover to humans.

Antibiotic-resistant bacteria and antimicrobial resistance genes enter sewage from human waste, healthcare facilities and other sources. Because sewage pools material from many people, researchers sample it to study resistance across communities. Wastewater connects human and environmental health, along with animal health where animal waste contributes, making it relevant to the One Health approach. It can complement hospital-based surveillance by capturing resistance beyond individual patients.

Laboratories use several methods. In culture-based testing, scientists grow bacteria from wastewater and test whether they resist particular antibiotics, demonstrating resistance in living organisms. PCR and quantitative PCR (qPCR) detect specific genes associated with resistance, while metagenomic sequencing examines a much wider range of the microbial genetic material in a sample. A 2025 review by Punch and colleagues identified 177 studies from 2014 to October 2024.

Repeated sampling may reveal changes in community-level resistance over time and adds information to clinical monitoring. Detecting resistance genes in sewage, however, does not show how many people have drug-resistant infections, and results depend on where and how samples are collected and which laboratory methods are used. World Health Organization guidance stresses careful surveillance design and appropriate interpretation of results. Wastewater surveillance therefore supplements testing of individual patients and cannot replace it.
