= Gerald Westbury =

- Born: 29 July 1927
- Died: 12 June 2014 (aged 86)
- Other name: Charley Westbury
- Citizenship: English
- Education: Westminster Hospital Medical School
- Spouse: Hazel Frame
- Awards: OBE, FRCS
- Scientific career
- Fields: Surgery
- Workplaces: Westminster Hospital, Royal Marsden Hospital

Gerald Westbury OBE FRCS (29 July 1927 – 12 June 2014), usually known as Charley Westbury, was an English surgeon who pioneered treatments for cancer, particularly sarcoma, developing techniques for preserving muscle function after surgery. He also developed new techniques of reconstructive surgery for cancers of the head and neck, and championed a multidisciplinary approach to cancer treatment.

== Education and career ==
Westbury was born in London and was educated at St Marylebone Grammar School, followed by studying medicine at Westminster Hospital Medical School. His National Service was carried out in the Royal Air Force, following which he became the resident surgical officer at the Brompton Hospital, then registrar at Westminster Hospital. Here he worked with Sir Stanford Cade, a pioneer in performing radical surgery for cancer, and combining this with radiotherapy.

Following a fellowship at Harvard Medical School, he was appointed consultant surgeon at Westminster Hospital in 1960, taking the place of Cade. In addition to being a Fellow of the Royal College of Surgeons, Westbury was also a Fellow of the Royal College of Physicians, an unusual combination of qualifications for a surgeon. His other appointments included being foundation Professor of Surgery at the Royal Marsden Hospital, and the Dean of the Institute of Cancer Research, where he established a Sarcoma Unit.

His honorary appointments included being honorary consultant surgeon to the British Army, president of the British Association of Surgical Oncology, and a Founding Fellow of Breakthrough Breast Cancer. Westbury was also an examiner at a number of medical schools. In 1990 he was appointed OBE.

== Therapeutic advances ==
At the time that Westbury was working with Cade it was believed that in the surgical treatment of cancer, the more tissue that was removed the better the outcome would be. But in many cases this caused severe disfigurement or loss of function. Westbury was one of the first to develop procedures that would preserve function as well as give good survival rates. He specialised in the treatment of sarcomas, and his surgical technique was, wherever possible, to leave some muscle tissue to preserve a degree of function.

Cade, who was a pioneer in the treatment of cancer by radiotherapy, first conducted joint clinics with radiotherapists at the Westminster Hospital. Westbury continued similar interdisciplinary clinics where surgeons worked with colleagues from other disciplines, an approach that has been shown to result in better outcomes.

He also played a part in developing new techniques and reconstructive procedures for treating cancers. In his 'commando procedure', one of the earliest such procedures to be developed, the diseased tissue is removed and replaced by transposed tissue from elsewhere still attached to the parent site so that its blood supply was maintained. He was also one of the physicians who introduced isolated limb perfusion for treating melanoma in his clinic. He studied the effect of injecting patients with cancer with the smallpox vaccine and human interferons.
