= Karl Schügerl =

Hungarian-German chemical engineer (1927–2018)

- Born: 22 June 1927; Sopron (Ödenburg), Hungary
- Died: 20 October 2018 (aged 91)
- Scientific career
- Fields: Biotechnology
- Workplaces: Institute of Technical Chemistry

Karl Schügerl (22 June 1927 – 20 October 2018) was a Hungarian-German chemical engineer. He was a member of the Hungarian Academy of Sciences. He also was awarded an honorary doctorate by the Budapest University. In 1992 vol. 46 of the Springer book series Advances in Biochemical Engineering/Biotechnology was dedicated to Karl Schügerl's 65-th birthday. Schügerl was awarded the DECHEMA Medal in 1997.

== Sources ==
- "Wissenschaftler der TU Dresden gewinnt Karl-Schügerl-Forschungspreis". uni-protokolle.de. October 4, 2001. Archived from the original on 13 June 2011.
- CV from the University page
- Detailed curriculum vitae (PDF): http://www.schuegerl-karl.homepage.t-online.de/Schuegerl-Lebenslauf.pdf
