= Pooled analysis =

Statistical technique used to combine multiple study results

A pooled analysis is a statistical technique for combining the results of multiple epidemiological studies. It is one of three types of literature reviews frequently used in epidemiology, along with meta-analysis and traditional narrative reviews. Pooled analyses may be either retrospective or prospective. It is often used when the results of individual studies do not allow for a firm conclusion to be drawn. Unlike meta-analyses, pooled analyses can only be conducted if the included studies used the same study design and statistical models, and if their respective populations were homogeneous. If individual-level data from the included studies is available, the result of a pooled analysis can be considered more reliable.
