= Ronald Canti =

British pathologist and bacteriologist

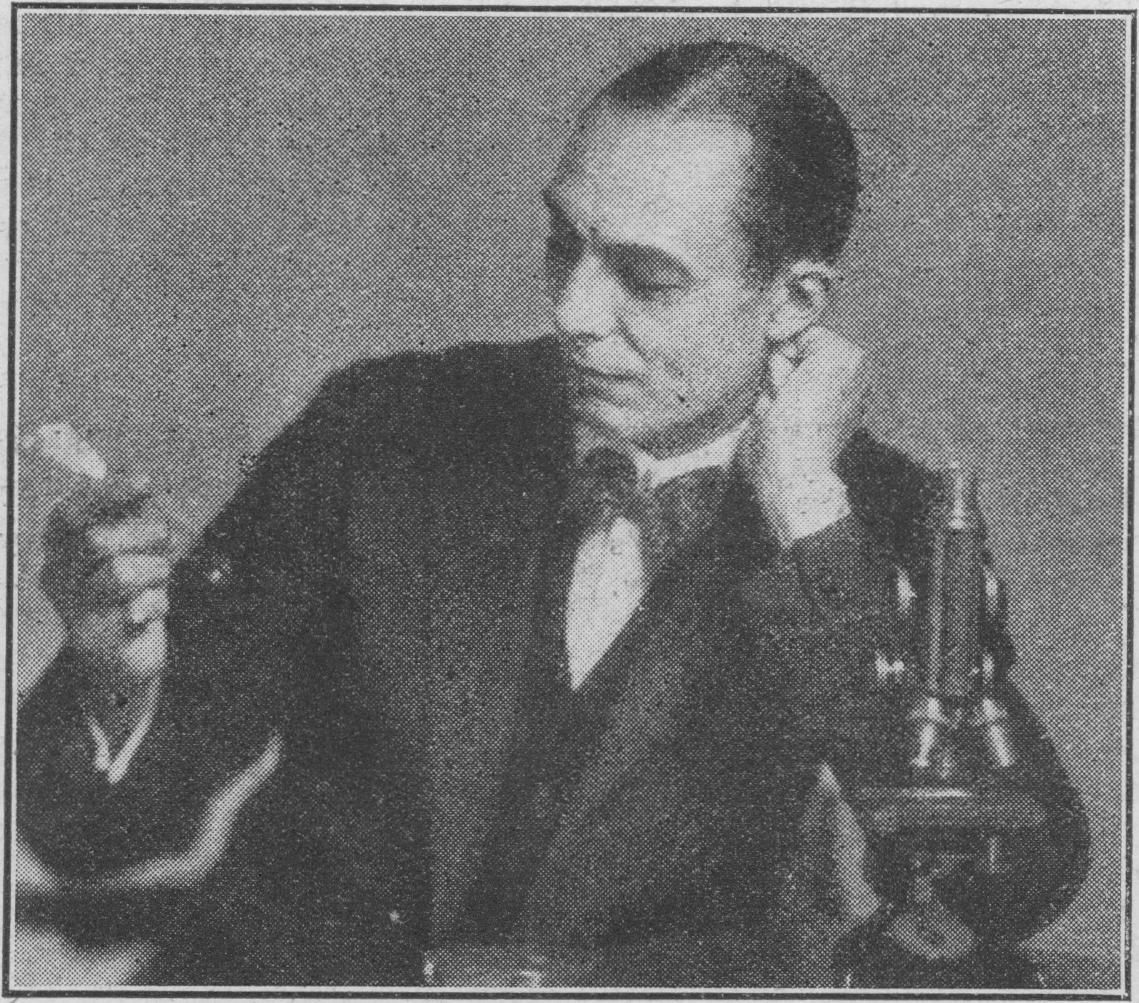
Dr Robert George Canti

Ronald George Canti M.D. (1883 – 7 January 1936) was a British pathologist and bacteriologist known for early micro-cinematography of living cells.

== Education ==
Born in 1883, Canti was educated at Charterhouse School. At King's College, Cambridge in 1911 he qualified for Membership of the Royal College of Surgeons (M.R.C.S.) and Licentiate of the Royal College of Physicians (LRCP) and undertook the M.B. degree in 1915 proceeding to M.D. in 1919.

== Career ==
Leaving Cambridge Canti was appointed house physician at St Bartholomew's Hospital, and embarked on his career as a pathologist. He continued as clinical pathologist there until his death, working under professor of pathology Sir Frederick Andrewes, who recognised and encouraged Canti.

In 1925 Canti was included in a research group of bacteriologists invited to the Rockefeller Institute after its discovery of the influenza 'bacterium pneumosintes' in mid-1923.

In issues of the A.S.C.C. Campaign Notes for 1928, and 1929 Canti was applauded for his research at the Strangeways Laboratory, Cambridge. His film's stop-motion technique vividly illustrated the microscopic behavior of normal and neoplastic cells. Irradiation was shown to cause immobilisation and mitotic arrest in suspensions of cells of fowl embryo periosteum (fibroblast) and Jensen rat sarcoma. Canti concluded that "It would appear that the hypothesis of the selective action [of irradiation] on the cells of a malignant tumour, has been again substantiated by this method of direct observation.''

Canti's work augmented other scientists' investigations of mammalian cell culture; Alexis Carrel was an early pioneer in the field and used his cinematograph to study the locomotion of fibroblasts and macrophages the technique detailed in Carrel’s technical assistant, Heinz Rosenberger's methods article in Science on the use of the microcinematographic apparatus, urged investigators ‘‘who have not yet realized the great possibilities of the motion-picture camera in research laboratories’’ to take it up. In the late 1920s and early 1930s their movie-making moved beyond cell culture; American embryologist Warren Lewis published a seminal time-lapse study of developing rabbit eggs, though Canti's film predated his; Lewis visited Ronald Canti in England in 1927 to study his microcinematographic equipment, then traveled with Canti and Honor Fell to Budapest where, comprehending its impact, assembled his own apparatus the Carnegie Institute for Embryology.

It took Canti six years to produce the complete film, and it involved his inventing novel apparatus;

"The trigger mechanism which determined the taking of a photograph and the changing of a photographic film was provided by a suitably modified electric clock which could be arranged to deliver electric impulses at the required intervals. A single impulse from the electric clock was led to a relay switch which closed the electric circuit actuating a small electric motor fitted with a suitable resistance in series for slow running. This motor was fitted with a worm gear and slowly revolved a drum carrying two cam wheels and four projecting arms for making mercury dip contacts. The function of the cam wheels was to pull upon wires running in a flexible spiral wire tube . . . and to actuate at a distance the two photographic shutters, the one for taking the microphotograph and the other for photographing the [clock]."

A more candid report of his making the film appeared on the event of Canti's death;

"To record the slow growth of tissue, Dr Canti invented an apparatus that would take pictures at regular and frequent intervals. The camera was automatic, but unhappily it was not always reliable, and Dr Canti fitted an electric bell to it, which warned him whenever it failed to act. Many times during the six years that the film took to make did the bell go off in the early hours of the morning. Indeed, Mrs Canti used to have to help her husband by taking turns in attending to the camera."

== Reception ==
Canti's film was enthusiastically received.

Described as "the most outstanding portrayal of the activities of the living cells ever shown In motion pictures." the film was shown not only in Budapest but at 10 Downing Street, in America, Australia and elsewhere.

Dame Honor Fell, director of the Strangeways Laboratory recalled in the 1950s that she would “never forget the sensation that his film of migration and mitosis created when he showed it” at the 1927 Tenth International Zoological Congress in Budapest, where it was shown on several occasions.

As Science journal reported on the 12th annual meeting of American Association For The Advancement Of Science Pacific Division with the Southwestern Division and a number of participating societies, held at Pomona College, 13–16 June 1928 with five hundred attendees;

On Wednesday afternoon the remarkable motion picture showing activities of living tissues in vitro, prepared by Dr. Ronald G. Canti, of the Cancer Institute and St. Bartholomew's Hospital, London, was shown. The periosteum of chick embryos, an amoeba and a sarcoma of the rat were seen with varying magnifications and varying rates of 'speeding up.' The behavior of blepharoplasts and other types of cells, the growth of tissues, cell-division and immobilization upon exposure to radium were all very clearly evident The film was demonstrated by Dr. C. A. Kofoid, president of the Pacific division, who had seen it in Europe and obtained it for the meeting. So many wished to see the film a second time that it was repeated on Friday morning.

Landecker considers that despite relative current obscurity, Canti "did more to legitimise the use of movie making as an experimental tool than any of the more widely known names in early ciné-microscopy."

== Early death ==
Canti died on 7 January 1936, aged 52, at his home The Gables in Wedderburn Road, Hampstead, survived by his four children and wife Clare Eyles whom he married in 1912, and who nursed him during his extended and fatal illness.

== Publications ==
- Canti, R. G; Cambridge Research Hospital (Cambridge, England), St. Bartholomew's Hospital (London, England) (1927). The cultivation of living tissue: irradiation of living tissue in vitro by beta and gamma rays; Dark ground illumination, showing the internal structures of the cell. England: R.G. Canti. OCLC 31666029.
- Canti, R. G (1927). The effect of irradiation on tissues. OCLC 822613427.
- Canti, R. G (1927), Irradiation of living tissue by beta and gamma rays., England: [s.n], OCLC 1157615762
- Canti, R. G (1927), Cells in tissue culture (normal and abnormal)., England: [s.n], OCLC 1157395694
- Canti, R. G (1929). The cultivation of skeletal tissue. England. OCLC 927503759.
- Canti, R. G (1931), The segmentation of the fertilised rabbit ovum., England: [s.n], OCLC 1157774434
- Canti, R. G (1933), The cultivation of living tissue., England: [s.n], OCLC 1157613520
- Canti, R. G (1935). Tissue cultur of gliomata. S.l.: s.n. OCLC 492458689.
