= Aichivirus A =

Virus classification
- (unranked): Virus
- Realm: Riboviria
- Kingdom: Orthornavirae
- Phylum: Pisuviricota
- Class: Pisoniviricetes
- Order: Picornavirales
- Family: Picornaviridae
- Genus: Kobuvirus
- Species: Aichivirus A

Species of virus

Aichivirus A formerly Aichi virus (AiV) belongs to the genus Kobuvirus in the family Picornaviridae. Six species are part of the genus Kobuvirus, Aichivirus A-F. Within Aichivirus A, there are six different types including human Aichi virus, canine kobuvirus, murine kobuvirus, Kathmandu sewage kobuvirus, roller kobuvirus, and feline kobuvirus. Three different genotypes are found in human Aichi virus, represented as genotype A, B, and C.

AiV is a non-enveloped positive sense ssRNA virus with icosahedral morphology. Aichivirus A was originally identified after a 1989 outbreak of acute gastroenteritis in the Aichi Prefecture that was linked to raw oyster consumption per genetic analysis. Human Aichi Virus can cause gastroenteritis with symptoms arising such as vomiting, diarrhea, abdominal pain, nausea, and feve.

Aichivirus A can be found in a variety of environmental areas including sewage, groundwater, river water, and shellfish. Aichivirus A is present in many world regions, and in sometimes greater abundance than other well-known enteric viruses. Aichiviruses have been seen in Asia, Europe, South America, and Africa. It has since been isolated in populations of Finnish children, Pakistani children, and Japanese travelers. The widespread nature of aichivirus A can be seen in the high percentage of AiV antibodies in adult human populations found in several countries.

Transmission occurs through the fecal-oral route. After the virus is replicated in the gastrointestinal tract, the pathogen can be found in fecal samples of infected individuals. Water and shellfish contaminated with human sewage can propagate aichivirus A.

== Discovery ==
Location of Aichi Prefecture in Japan. The location of the first Aichivirus outbreak.

Aichivirus A was first characterized after an outbreak of gastroenteritis in the Aichi Prefecture of Japan, this region is where the name of the virus was derived from. Fecal samples from infected individuals were taken and transported to a lab where they described the novel virus. These viral particles were 30 nm in diameter, a spherical shape, and cytopathic for BSC-1 cells (kidney cells of African green monkey). The infection was attributed to contaminated raw oyster found in vinegar.

Aichivirus A has been seen and described across many Asian countries, however the first appearance of aichivirus outside of this region was isolated in Europe and South America in 2006. Through genetic analysis of isolates from Brazil and Germany, the nucleotide sequences were found to be similar to known Aichivirus nucleotide sequences. Notably, the German strain appeared to be of genotype A and the Brazil strain appeared to be of genotype B. Screening in Germany for antibodies to Aichivirus displayed a seroprevalence of 76%, which is comparable to seroprevalence in Japan. Therefore, European infection with Aichivirus is as common as it is in Asia.

== Human infection ==
Positive Sense Single-Stranded RNA Viral Mechanism

=== Propagation ===
Aichivirus A enters host cells through receptor-mediated endocytosis, a cellular uptake mechanism. After viral attachment and entry, the virion particle is uncoated releasing the genome into the cytoplasm. Similar to other viruses within the Picornaviridae family, viral replication and translation occurs in the cytoplasm. The positive sense ssRNA is directly translated into protein by the host cell ribosomes, while some of the ssRNA is used as a template to replicate the viral genome. Capsid proteins, L protein, nonstructural proteins, and stable intermediates are produced after the polyprotein is processed. Protein production is directly related to synthesis of plus-strand RNA replication complex. The plus-strand RNA genome is packaged into the assembled viral particle, along with VpG (Viral genomic protein). A completed viral particle has 60 capsid proteins copies made up of 12 pentamers. The pentamer is made up by the 5S subunit composed of VP0, VP1, and VP3 protein aggregates. After the viral particle is assembled, it is released from host cells by cell lysis, making Aichivirus A a lytic virus.

=== Characteristics ===
Most aichivirus A infection in humans are mild, asymptomatic infections lasting between 48–72 hours. However, it can develop into the common symptoms of gastroenteritis: fever, nausea, vomiting, abdominal pain. Viral replication in the gastrointestinal tract damages the enterocyte layer in the intestinal villi interfering with water reabsorption This can lead to the symptoms appearing with infection.

Aichivirus A can become an opportunistic pathogen in those with HIV and is seen in high levels in the feces of those with HIV. Aichivirus A is also suspected as an opportunistic pathogan in those with X-linked agammaglobulinemia. Aichivirus is an emerging pathogen in those with B-cell deficiencies, however there is no explanation why In patients with primary immune deficiencies, chronic aichivirus infection can cause immunodysregulation. Human aichivirus was deemed to effect multiple organs leading to the clinical symptom presentation. The aichivirus genome was detected in symptomatic patients and in infected organs, while it was not seen in asymptomatic individuals. Notably, in Japan there is a correlation with aichivirus A infection and lower respiratory tract disease.

== Genome ==
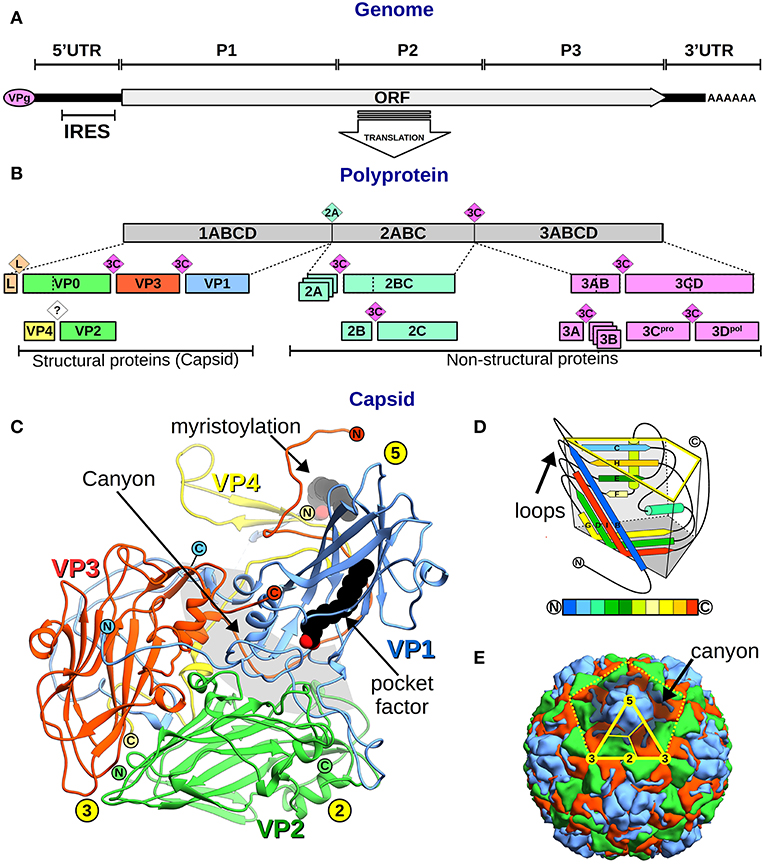
Picornavirus Genome Organization (Aichivirus A is a member of the Picornavirus family).

The RNA genome of AiV A is composed of 8280 nucleotides. Along the 5' end of the RNA, there is an untranslated region consisting of 744 nucleotides, a VpG protein, and an internal ribosomal entry site (IRES). Following the 5' untranslated region, the open reading frame is approximately 7.3kB consisting of 2432 amino acids. The L protein, leader peptide, is the first protein translated within the polypeptide, followed by the structural proteins, and then nonstructural proteins. Cleavage into the different proteins occurs by viral proteases. The capsid proteins are made up of three segments in the RNA: VP0, VP3, and VP1. These capsid proteins together are known as the P1 region on the genome. The encoded capsid proteins form a protomer that form into 12 pentamers during self-assembly. X-ray crystallography of human aichi virus virion structure determined that the VP3 knob structure and VP0 surface loop are smaller compared to other viruses in picornaviruses. P2 and P3 are the regions of the RNA genome that are the non-structural proteins involved in replication control. For example, the protein 3D within the P3 region encodes for the viral RNA-dependent RNA polymerase used in replication. The 3B protein also in the P3 region encodes for the VpG protein, which is important promoting replication. Following the P2 and P3 region, there is a 3' untranslated region of about 237 nucleotides and a poly-A tail.

=== Genotypic differences ===
Differences at the 3CD nonstructural protein junction in the viral genome results in distinct genotypic differences. When comparing the junction between the C-terminus of the 3C region and the N-terminus of the 3D region, three distinct genotypic types are seen. In studies, there appeared to be a geographical distribution to the genotypes. In some countries genotype B is prevalent, while in others genotype A dominates. In Finland and Spain genotype A was more prevalent. However, in China, Bangladesh, and Pakistan genotype B is more widely seen in gastroenteritis outbreaks. However, genotype C is not widely seen to cause human infection and has only been described in one study a fecal sample from a child case of gastroenteritis after a trip to Mali. The VP1 region is used to classify the picornaviruses and can also be used to differentiate between aichivirus A genotypes. Some studies have seen more variation in the VP1 region and suggest that this region may be a better region to differentiate between genotypes.

== Environmental occurrence ==
Aichivirus A can be found in a variety of environmental sources potentially leading to infection through food and water consumption. Aichivirus A causes infection through the fecal-oral route, where contaminated food and water sources are ingested. Some studies suggest using Aichivirus A as a method to detect viral contamination in environmental samples.

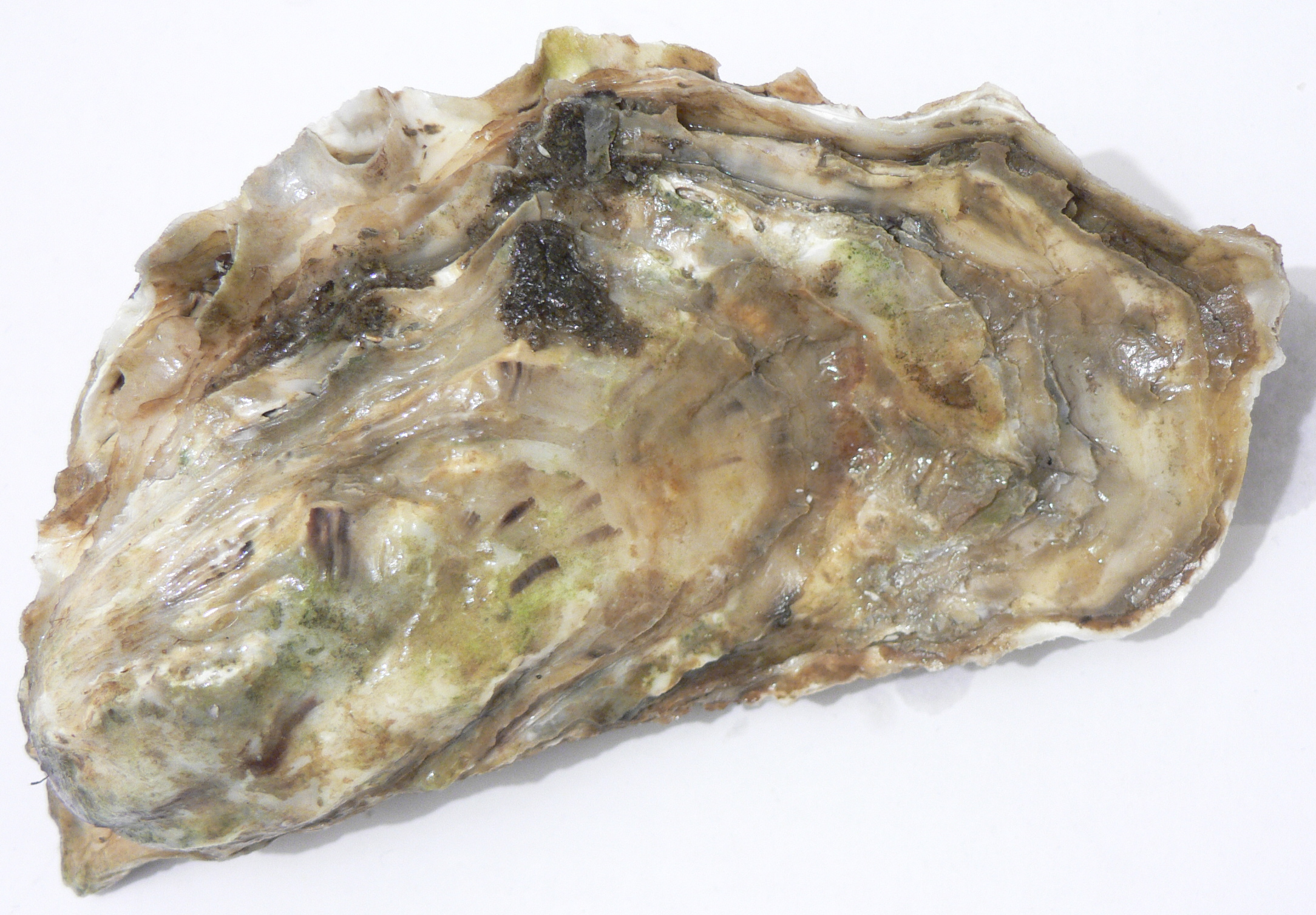
Aichivirus A can be transmitted through contaminated seafood, such as an oyster.

=== Shellfish ===
Enteric viruses can propagate through bivalve mollusks which filter surrounding water for food and retain enteric viruses. Many safety protocols only take into account bacteria and not viruses, which makes shellfish a vector for viral transmission. Aichivirus A was first detected in an outbreak due to contaminated oysters, and contaminated seafood has been associated with aichivrius A outbreaks worldwide. In a year-long study in Japan on viral detection in clams, 33% of the grocery store samples contained aichivirus A.

=== Sewage ===
Aichivirus A has been reported at high rates in wastewater but was first seen in 2010. Wastewater treatment cannot get rid of all the viral particles before being discharged into the environment. Due to the stability of aichivirus in sewage before and after treatment, aichivirus A is likely a human fecal pollutant indicator. Aichivirus A has been detected in wastewater in America, Europe, Africa, and Asia. In one study, samples of treated sewage contained a 91.7% prevalence of aichivirus A.

=== River and ground water ===
River water and ground water can be a reservoir for aichivirus A, due to viruses not being removed during the natural filtration cycle. Aichivirus A was first studied in river water in Venezuela in 2010 with detection in 45% of samples. Aichivirus A has since been detected in water sources worldwide, including in tap water and ground water in America.

== Research ==
Under an electron microscope, Aichivirus A appears as a small, round virus making it hard to distinguish it from other viruses with a similar morphology. Under electron microscopy, a canyon-like valley is seen on the surface of the capsid, likely where receptor binding occurs for entry. The viral particle is stable in acidic conditions until a pH of 2 and remains stable under known experimental methods to disrupt the viral particle. These methods include heat, hydrostatic pressure, and detergent conditions. In human cell lines like HeLa, a cytopathic effect is not seen, however a cytopathic effect is seen in BSC-1 cell lines and Vero Cells.

An enzyme-linked immunoabsorbant assay (ELISA) has been developed to detect aichivirus A antigens. Reverse transcription-RNA polymerase chain reaction is also widely used in aichivirus research for identification and genotype differentiation. A loop-mediated isothermal amplification (LAMP) assay has been created for aichivirus A to be used in water samples. The LAMP assay allows for a rapid and specific detection of aichivirus A. Reverse transcription-quantitative PCR (RT-qPCR) is also widely used for detection and to determine viral numbers.
