= David P. Craig =

Australian chemist (1919–2015)

David Craig AO FRS FAA FRSN
- Born: David Parker Craig; 23 December 1919; Sydney, New South Wales
- Died: 1 July 2015 (aged 95); Canberra, Australian Capital Territory
- Education: University of Sydney; University College London
- Spouse: Veronica (Ronia) Bryden-Brown
- Children: 4
- Scientific career
- Workplaces: University of Sydney; University College London; Australian National University
- Thesis: Energy levels in conjugated and aromatic molecules (1949)

David Parker Craig (23 December 1919 – 1 July 2015), an Australian chemist, was the Foundation Professor of Physical and Theoretical Chemistry and later emeritus professor in the Research School of Chemistry at the Australian National University in Canberra.

Born in Sydney, Craig was educated at the University of Sydney, receiving a Bachelor of Science with Honours in 1940 and a Master of Science in 1941. He was awarded a Doctor of Philosophy degree from the University of London in 1949. He was a captain in the Second Australian Imperial Force from 1942 to 1944. Craig was a lecturer in physical chemistry, at the University of Sydney from 1944 to 1946, a Turner and Newall Research Fellow and Lecturer at University College, London from 1946 to 1952, Professor in physical chemistry at the University of Sydney from 1952 to 1956 and Professor in theoretical chemistry at University College, London from 1956 to 1967.

He was a Fellow of the Royal Society, the Royal Society of New South Wales, the Australian Academy of Science, a former President of AAS, and a Member of the International Academy of Quantum Molecular Science. In 1985 he was appointed an Officer of the Order of Australia (AO) "in recognition of service to the community, particularly in the field of physical chemistry", and was a recipient of the Centenary Medal "for service to Australian society and science in theoretical chemistry".

== Family ==
David Craig married Veronica (Ronia) Bryden-Brown on 25 August 1948, in Caversham, England. Ronia was the daughter of Cyril Bryden-Brown and Kathleen (née Parkinson), who was born in Cooma, New South Wales. David and Ronia had four children.

Aged 95, Craig died on 1 July 2015 at Calvary Hospital, Canberra.

== See also ==
- Craig plot
