= Michael Abraham (chemist) =

English chemist (died 2021)

- Born: 11 December 1931; London, England
- Died: 19 January 2021 (aged 89)

Academic background
- Education: Northern Polytechnic London; University College London
- Doctoral advisor: Alwyn Davies

Academic work
- Discipline: Physical organic chemistry
- Institutions: University College London
- Notable ideas: Abraham General Solvation Model

Michael H Abraham (11 December 1931, London – 19 January 2021) was an English chemist. He mainly worked in the area of physical organic chemistry, with his research interests being hydrogen bonding, solvation, linear free energy relationships (LFER), quantitative structure-activity relationships (QSAR) and solute-solvent interactions. A faculty member of University College London since 1988, Abraham was known within his field for creating the Abraham General Solvation Model.

== Biography ==
Abraham was born 11 December 1931 in London to Judah and Elizabeth Abraham. He was one of four boys. He attended Magnus Grammar School in Newark-on-Trent before graduating with first class honours from Northern Polytechnic London, where he studied chemistry, in 1951. He then earned his PhD from University College London (UCL) under Alwyn Davies, and later his DSc in 1974. He became a reader at Battersea Polytechnic until 1988, when he returned to UCL.

Between 1957 and 1969, Abraham largely focused on the chemistry of organometallic compounds. Key works done by Abraham and his UCL colleagues include the measuring and calculation of molecular properties of thousands of molecules. These properties include H-bond acidity and basicity, dipolarity and polarisability. He received two Ebert awards from the American Pharmaceutical Association: one in 1992 for his paper Role of hydrogen bonding in general anaesthesia, and again in 2002 for his paper on the "valuation of human intestinal absorption data and subsequent derivation". His work led him to appear on Thomson Reuters' list of Highly Cited Researchers.

== Personal life ==
Michael Abraham and his wife Elisabeth Mayer (died 1999) had two sons, Benjamin and Jonathan. Elisabeth had also been a PhD student at UCL. Abraham was a hobby landscape painter and held several exhibitions throughout London. Additionally, he enjoyed classical, particularly chamber, music.

Abraham died on 19 January 2021, aged 89.

== Selected publications ==
- Abraham, M.H. (1971). "Substitution at saturated carbon. Part VIII. Solvent effects on the free energy of trimethylamine, the nitrobenzyl chlorides, and the trimethylamine–nitrobenzyl chloride transition states". Journal of the Chemical Society B: Physical Organic: 299–308. doi:10.1039/J29710000299.
- Abraham, M.H.; Chadha, H.S.; Martins, F.; Mitchell, R.; Gratton, J.A.; Bradbry, M.W. (1997). "A general equation for the correlation of transport properties of drugs and other compounds". Farmacevtski Vestnik. 8: 236–237.
- Abraham, M.H.; Whiting, G.S.; Shuely, W.J.; Doherty, R.M. (1998). "The solubility of gases and vapours in ethanol - the connection between gaseous solubility and water-solvent partition". Canadian Journal of Chemistry. 76 (6): 703–709. doi:10.1139/v98-029.
- Abraham, M.H.; Le, J. (1999). "The correlation and prediction of the solubility of compounds in water using an amended solvation energy relationship". Journal of Pharmaceutical Sciences. 88 (9): 868–880. doi:10.1021/js9901007. PMID 10479348.
- Abraham, M.H.; Platts, J.A. (2001). "Hydrogen Bond Structural Group Constants". Journal of Organic Chemistry. 66 (10): 3484–3491. doi:10.1021/jo001765s. PMID 11348133.
- Abraham, M.H.; Zissimos, A.M.; Acree, W.E. (2003). "Partition of solutes into wet and dry ethers; an LFER analysis". New Journal of Chemistry. 27: 1041–1044. doi:10.1039/b303016d.
- Cometto-Muniz, J.E.; Cain, W.S.; Abraham, M.H. (2005). "Molecular restrictions for human eye irritation by chemical vapors". Toxicology and Applied Pharmacology. 207 (3): 232–243. doi:10.1016/j.taap.2005.02.004.
- Abraham, Michael H.; Acree, William E. (2011). "Hydrogen bond descriptors and other properties of ion pairs". New Journal of Chemistry. 35 (8): 1740–1750. doi:10.1039/C1NJ20324J.
- Abraham, Michael H.; Acree, William; Ràfols, Clara; Rosés, Martí (April 2021). "Equations for the Correlation and Prediction of Partition Coefficients of Neutral Molecules and Ionic Species in the Water–Isopropanol Solvent System". Journal of Solution Chemistry. 50 (4): 458–472. doi:10.1007/s10953-021-01063-w. hdl:2445/184953.
