= Winstein =

Winstein is a surname. Notable people with the surname include:

- Bruce Winstein (1943–2011), American physicist and cosmologist
- Keith Winstein, American computer scientist and journalist
- Saul Winstein (1912–1969), Canadian chemist

- Grunwald–Winstein equation, physical organic chemistry equation, developed with Ernest Grunwald
