= Louis Plack Hammett =

American chemist

- Born: 7 April 1894
- Died: 9 February 1987 (aged 92)
- Education: Columbia University (Ph.D)
- Known for: Hammett equation
- Awards: William H. Nichols Medal (1957); Priestley Medal (1961); Willard Gibbs Award (1961); National Medal of Science (1967); Barnard Medal for Meritorious Service to Science (1975)
- Scientific career
- Fields: Physical Chemistry

Louis Plack Hammett (April 7, 1894 – February 9, 1987) was an American physical chemist. He is known for the Hammett equation, which relates reaction rates to equilibrium constants for certain classes of organic reactions involving substituted aromatic compounds. He is also known for his research into superacids and his development of a scheme for comparing their acidities based on what is now known as the Hammett acidity function. The Curtin–Hammett principle bears his name.

The awards he obtained included the Priestley Medal in 1961, the Willard Gibbs Award in 1961, the National Medal of Science in 1967, and in 1975 the Barnard Medal for Meritorious Service to Science.

Hammett grew up in Portland, Maine, and studied in Harvard and Switzerland. He earned his Ph.D. at Columbia University. He authored an influential textbook on physical organic chemistry, and is credited with coining the term.
