= Craig plot =

Craig plot showing values of Hansch pi and Hammett sigma constants for 26 common organic substituents

The Craig plot, named after Paul N. Craig, is a plot of two substituent parameters (e.g. Hansch-Fujita π constant and sigma constant) used in rational drug design.

Two most used forms of a Craig plot are

- plotting the sigma constants of the Hammett equation versus hydrophobicity
- plotting the steric terms of the Taft equation against hydrophobicity

== See also ==
- Quantitative structure-activity relationship
- pKa
