= Yukawa–Tsuno equation =

Free-energy relationship in organic chemistry

The Yukawa–Tsuno equation, first developed in 1959, is a linear free-energy relationship in physical organic chemistry. It is a modified version of the Hammett equation that accounts for enhanced resonance effects in electrophilic reactions of para- and meta-substituted organic compounds. This equation does so by introducing a new term to the original Hammett relation that provides a measure of the extent of resonance stabilization for a reactive structure that builds up charge (positive or negative) in its transition state. The Yukawa–Tsuno equation can take the following forms:

$$\log \frac{k_X}{k_0} = \rho(\sigma + r(\sigma^+ - \sigma))$$

$$\log \frac{k_X}{k_0} = \rho(\sigma + r(\sigma^- - \sigma))$$

where k_{X} and k_{0} represent the rate constants for an X-substituted and unsubstituted compound, respectively; ρ represents the Hammett reaction constant; σ represents the Hammett substituent constant; σ^{+} and σ^{−} represent the Hammett substituent constants for reactions in which positive or negative charges are built up at the reactive center, respectively; and r represents the Yukawa–Tsuno parameter.

== Background ==
The Hammett substituent constant, σ, is composed of two independent terms: an inductive effect σ_{I} and a resonance polar effect σ_{R}. These components represent the consequences of the presence of a particular substituent on reactivity through sigma and pi bonds, respectively. For a particular substituent, the value of σ is generally assumed to be a constant, irrespective of the nature of the reaction; however, it has been shown that for reactions of para-substituted compounds in which the transition state bears a nearly full charge, σ_{R} does not remain constant, and thus, the sum $\sigma = \sigma_R+\sigma_I$ is also variable. In other words, for such reactions, application of the standard Hammett Equation does not produce a linear plot. To correlate these deviations from linearity, Yasuhide Yukawa and Yuho Tsuno proposed a modification to the original Hammett equation which accounts exclusively for enhanced resonance effects due to the high electron demand during such reactions.

== Modified Hammett equation ==
In their 1959 publication, Yukawa and Tsuno attributed observed deviations from Hammett Plot linearity in electrophilic reactions to additional resonance effects occurring through the pi bonds of substituent groups in their compounds. This implied that the inductive component of the Hammett substituent constant remains constant in such reactions, while the resonance component, σ_{R}, does not. From this assumption, the two scientists defined a new resonance substituent constant, G(R), that is mathematically represented as follows:

$$\begin{align}
G(R) &= \sigma^+ - \sigma
\\
& = (\sigma^+_I + \sigma^+_R) - (\sigma_I + \sigma_R)
\\
& = \sigma^+_R - \sigma_R
\end{align}$$,

for a reaction in which positive charge is built up at the reactive center in the transition state. In order to quantify the extent of the observed enhanced resonance effects, Yukawa and Tsuno introduced an enhanced resonance parameter, r, that quantifies the "demand for resonance" at the reactive center. Thus, the resultant Yukawa–Tsuno effective substituent constant is given by:

$$\sigma^' = \sigma + rG(R) = \sigma + r(\sigma^+ - \sigma)$$,

and the Yukawa–Tsuno equation (modified Hammett equation) takes the form:

$$\begin{align}
\log \frac{k_X}{k_0} &= \rho\sigma^'
\\
&=  \rho(\sigma + r(\sigma^+ - \sigma))
\end{align}$$

Values of $\sigma^+ - \sigma$ have been determined and catalogued for a number of substituents for quick application of the Yukawa–Tsuno equation.

== Enhanced resonance parameter, r ==
The enhanced resonance parameter, r, is a measure of the influence of resonance on a new reaction. When $r = 0$, the resonance effects for a particular reaction are no different from those for reaction of the unsubstituted reference compound. However, when $r > 0$, the reaction in question is more sensitive to resonance effects than the standard, and when $r < 0$, the reaction is less sensitive to such effects.

The enhanced resonance parameter is determined by first establishing the Hammett Reaction constant from data collected from meta-substituted compounds, and subsequently correlating the remaining data to fit the modified equation described above.

== Limitations ==
The Yukawa–Tsuno equation allows for treatment of both para- and meta- substituents, and it also better correlates data from reactions with high electron demand than the original Hammett equation. However, this equation does not take into account the effects of various solvents on organic reactions. Also, Yukawa and Tsuno note that, even within a group of similar reactions, r-values for more electron-withdrawing substituents tend to be higher than predicted—seen as a slight increase in slope on a Yukawa–Tsuno plot—and thus, are not as strongly correlated with the remainder of the data.

== See also ==
- Free-energy relationship
- Hammett equation
- Quantitative structure-activity relationship
