= Free-energy relationship =

Characteristic of a chemical reaction

A free energy relationship, also known as a Gibbs energy relationship, relates the Gibbs free energy change ΔG of one series of chemical reactions to the ΔG of the same or another, related series of reactions. Here, ΔG represents the difference in Gibbs energy between two states of a reaction.

Such reaction series are typically generated by systematic structural modifications, such as changing substituents on reactants or substrates, or by introducing amino acid mutations into enzyme proteins. Additionally, reaction conditions such as the type of solvent may also be changed. In many cases, the relationship between two Gibbs free energy changes can be approximated by a linear correlation. This linear relationship is known as a linear free energy relationship. It is often abbreviated as LFER.

In a broad sense, free-energy relationships include correlations between two ΔG° (the standard free energy difference between two stable states) values and also correlations between two ΔG^{‡} (the activation free energy) values. However, the term is most commonly used to describe correlations between ΔG^{‡} and ΔG°. When expressed in terms of experimentally accessible quantities, this corresponds to a correlation between the logarithm of a reaction rate constant (log k) and the logarithm of a equilibrium constant (log K). This form is known as the rate–equilibrium free energy relationship (REFER).

Using REFER, a linear free energy relationship can be written as

$$\log k = \alpha \log K + \beta$$

or relative to a reference r,

$$\log \left(\frac{k}{k_r} \right) = \alpha \log \left(\frac{K}{K_r} \right)$$

which may also be expressed as

$$\Delta \log k = \alpha \Delta \log K$$

where Δlog k represents the difference in log k value relative to the reference log k_{r}. In this form, the relationship is a proportional one that passes through the origin, emphasizing the linear dependence between the two free energy changes.

The equilibrium constant K is determined solely by the free energy difference between the initial and final stable states and remains unchanged regardless of the reaction path. In contrast, the rate constant k depends on the reaction path and the transition state. Consequently, a simple correlation between k and K is not generally expected. Thus, a linear correlation in the REFER plot highlights the significance of linear free energy relationships.

Linear free energy relationships are often used to estimate rate or equilibrium constants since they are experimentally difficult to determine.

In the classical sense, free energy relationships establish the extent at which bond formation and breakage happen in the transition state of a reaction. Establishing free energy relationships allows us to understand the reaction mechanism. For this purpose, it is effective when combined with kinetic isotope experiments.

Although the International Union of Pure and Applied Chemistry (IUPAC) recommends the term linear Gibbs energy relationship in place of linear free energy relationship, the latter remains widely used in the literature.

== Chemistry ==
Well-known examples of linear free energy relationships in chemistry include the Brønsted relation and Hammett relation used in chemical kinetics. The Brønsted catalysis equation describes the relationship between the ionization constant of a series of catalysts and the reaction rate constant for a reaction on which the catalyst operates. The Hammett equation predicts the equilibrium constant or reaction rate of a reaction from a substituent constant and a reaction type constant.

Beyond these classical examples, the Edwards equation relates nucleophilicity to both polarizability and basicity, while the Marcus theory explains the rates of electron transfer reactions – the rate at which an electron can move or jump from one chemical species (called the electron donor) to another (called the electron acceptor). The Marcus theory provides an example of a quadratic free energy relationship (QFER), in which the reaction barrier depends quadratically on the reaction free energy.

== Physical Chemistry (partition between two phases) ==
A typical LFER relation for predicting the equilibrium concentration of a compound or solute in the vapor phase to a condensed (or solvent) phase can be defined as follows (following M.H. Abraham and co-workers):

$$\log \mathrm{SP} = c + e\mathrm{E} + s\mathrm{S} + a\mathrm{A} + b\mathrm{B} + l\mathrm{L}$$

where SP is some free-energy related property, such as an adsorption or absorption constant, log K, anesthetic potency, etc. The lowercase letters (e, s, a, b, l) are system constants describing the contribution of the aerosol phase to the sorption process. The capital letters (E, S, A, B, L) are solute descriptors representing the complementary properties of the compounds. Specifically,

- L is the gas–liquid partition constant on n-hexadecane at 298 K;
- E = the excess molar refraction (E = 0 for n-alkanes).
- S = the ability of a solute to stabilize a neighbouring dipole by virtue of its capacity for orientation and induction interactions;
- A = the solute's effective hydrogen bond acidity; and
- B = the solute's effective hydrogen-bond basicity.

The complementary system constants are identified as

- l = the contribution from cavity formation and dispersion interactions;
- e = the contribution from interactions with solute n-electrons and pi electrons;
- s = the contribution from dipole-type interactions;
- a = the contribution from hydrogen-bond basicity (because a basic sorbent will interact with an acidic solute); and
- b = the contribution from hydrogen-bond acidity to the transfer of the solute from air to the aerosol phase.

Similarly, the correlation of solvent–solvent partition coefficients as log SP, is given by

$$\log \mathrm{SP} = c + e\mathrm{E} + s\mathrm{S} + a\mathrm{A} + b\mathrm{B} + v\mathrm{V}$$

where V is McGowan's characteristic molecular volume in cubic centimeters per mole divided by 100.

== Biochemistry ==
In biochemistry, linear free energy relationships are widely used to analyze enzyme reaction mechanisms using series of structurally related substrates or systematic amino-acid substitutions within enzyme proteins.

== Biophysics ==
LFER analysis is also applied to the folding and unfolding reactions of protein molecules. In the presence of high concentrations of denaturants such as urea and guanidine hydrochloride, protein molecules are denatured and do not form stable structures. When the denaturant is removed, the protein molecules return to their native structures in a short timescale of microseconds to milliseconds. This refolding process is called protein refolding.

The φ-value analysis, based on single–amino acid mutations, is a well-established method for probing the transition state of protein refolding reactions. The φ value represents the extent to which the native-state interactions around the side chain of a mutated residue are formed in the transition state ensemble. In an idealized case, φ values are either 0 or 1, corresponding to completely unformed or fully formed native interactions, respectively; however, experimentally determined values typically fall between 0 and 1.

Residue-based LFER is a special form of linear free-energy relationship in which multiple amino acid residues within a single polypeptide chain are monitored as local probes under single experimental conditions. This approach is applicable to a wide range of protein conformational changes, from small-scale fluctuations to large structural changes, such as coupled binding and folding of intrinsically disordered proteins (IDPs) to target proteins.

Residue-based LFER can be derived mathematically from the consistency principle of protein folding, originally proposed by Nobuhiro Gō in 1983. Both residue-based LFER and its generalized quadratic free energy relationship (QFER) provide residue-specific information about the transition states of protein structural changes. The information obtained is equivalent to that obtained from the φ-value analysis. Combining local probe measurements with amino-acid substitutions further extends the applicability of residue-based LFER and QFER approaches.

== See also ==
- Brønsted catalysis equation
- Hammett equation
- Taft equation
- Swain–Lupton equation
- Grunwald–Winstein equation
- Yukawa–Tsuno equation
- Edwards equation
- Marcus equation
- Bell–Evans–Polanyi principle
- Quantitative structure–activity relationship
