= Hammett equation =

Free-energy relationship in organic chemistry

In organic chemistry, the Hammett equation describes a linear free-energy relationship relating reaction rates and equilibrium constants for many reactions involving benzoic acid derivatives with meta- and para-substituents to each other with just two parameters: a substituent constant and a reaction constant. This equation was developed and published by Louis Plack Hammett in 1937 as a follow-up to qualitative observations in his 1935 publication.

The basic idea is that for any two reactions with two aromatic reactants only differing in the type of substituent, the change in free energy of activation is proportional to the change in Gibbs free energy. It is important to understand, that the equilibrium constants in this relationship come from thermodynamics but the reaction rate constants come from chemical kinetics, and neither discipline predicts such relationship. Instead, it was introduced by Hammett empirically. (Note: The opening line in his 1935 publication reads: "The idea that there is some sort of relationship between the rate of a reaction and the equilibrium constant is one of the most persistently held and at the same time most emphatically denied concepts in chemical theory".) Hammett equation belongs to a larger set of correlations between the rate of a chemical reaction and its driving force.

The basic equation is:

$$\log \frac{K}{K_0} = \sigma\rho$$

where

${K}_0$ = Reference constant
$\sigma$ = Substituent constant
$\rho$ = Reaction constant

relating the equilibrium constant, ${K}$, for a given equilibrium reaction with substituent R and the reference constant ${K}_0$ when R is a hydrogen atom to the substituent constant σ which depends only on the specific substituent R and the reaction rate constant ρ which depends only on the type of reaction but not on the substituent used.

The equation also holds for reaction rates k of a series of reactions with substituted benzene derivatives:

$$\log \frac{k}{k_0} = \sigma\rho$$

In this equation ${k}_0$ is the reference reaction rate of the unsubstituted reactant, and k that of a substituted reactant.

A plot of $\log \frac{K}{K_0}$ for a given equilibrium versus $\log \frac{k}{k_0}$ for a given reaction rate with many differently substituted reactants will give a straight line.

== Substituent constants ==
The starting point for the collection of the substituent constants is a chemical equilibrium for which the substituent constant is arbitrarily set to 0 and the reaction constant is set to 1: the deprotonation of benzoic acid or benzene carboxylic acid (R and R' both H) in water at 25 °C.

Scheme 1. Dissociation of benzoic acids

Substituent constants: para and meta substituted benzene rings.
Substituent	para- effect	meta- effect
Dimethylamino	−0.83	−0.211
Amino	−0.66	−0.161
Butylamino	−0.51	−0.34
Hydroxy	−0.37	+0.12
Methoxy	−0.268	+0.115
Ethoxy	−0.25	+0.015
Methyl	−0.170	−0.069
Trimethylsilyl	−0.07	−0.04
None	0.000	0.000
Fluoro	+0.062	+0.337
Chloro	+0.227	+0.373
Bromo	+0.232	+0.393
Iodo	+0.276	+0.353
Ethoxycarbonyl	+0.45	+0.37
Trifluoromethyl	+0.54	+0.43
Cyano	+0.66	+0.56
Nitro	+0.778	+0.710

Having obtained a value for K_{0}, a series of equilibrium constants (K) are now determined based on the same process, but now with variation of the para substituent—for instance, p-hydroxybenzoic acid (R=OH, R'=H) or p-aminobenzoic acid (R=NH_{2}, R'=H). These values, combined in the Hammett equation with K_{0} and remembering that ρ = 1, give the para substituent constants compiled in table 1 for amine, methoxy, ethoxy, dimethylamino, methyl, fluorine, bromine, chlorine, iodine, nitro and cyano substituents. Repeating the process with meta-substituents afford the meta substituent constants. This treatment does not include ortho-substituents, which would introduce steric effects.

The σ values displayed in the Table above reveal certain substituent effects. With ρ = 1, the group of substituents with increasing positive values—notably cyano and nitro—cause the equilibrium constant to increase compared to the hydrogen reference, meaning that the acidity of the carboxylic acid (depicted on the left of the equation) has increased. These substituents stabilize the negative charge on the carboxylate oxygen atom by an electron-withdrawing inductive effect (−I) and also by a negative mesomeric effect (−M).

The next set of substituents are the halogens, for which the substituent effect is still positive but much more modest. The reason for this is that while the inductive effect is still negative, the mesomeric effect is positive, causing partial cancellation. The data also show that for these substituents, the meta effect is much larger than the para effect, due to the fact that the mesomeric effect is greatly reduced in a meta substituent. With meta substituents a carbon atom bearing the negative charge is further away from the carboxylic acid group (structure 2b).

This effect is depicted in scheme 3, where, in a para substituted arene 1a, one resonance structure 1b is a quinoid with positive charge on the X substituent, releasing electrons and thus destabilizing the Y substituent. This destabilizing effect is not possible when X has a meta orientation.

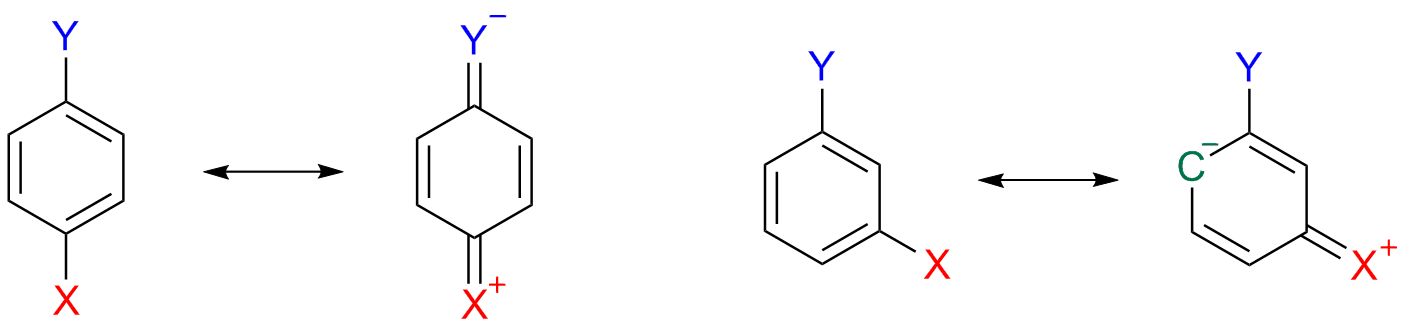
Scheme 3. Hammett Inductive Mesomeric Effects

Other substituents, like methoxy and ethoxy, can even have opposite signs for the substituent constant as a result of opposing inductive and mesomeric effect. Only alkyl and aryl substituents like methyl are electron-releasing in both respects.

Of course, when the sign for the reaction constant is negative (next section), only substituents with a likewise negative substituent constant will increase equilibrium constants.

=== The σ_{p}^{−} and σ_{p}^{+} constants ===
Because the carbonyl group is unable to serve a source of electrons for −M groups (in contrast to lone pair donors like OH), for reactions involving phenol and aniline starting materials, the σ_{p} values for electron-withdrawing groups will appear too small. For reactions where resonance effects are expected to have a major impact, a modified parameter, and a modified set of σ_{p}^{−} constants may give a better fit. This parameter is defined using the ionization constants of para substituted phenols, via a scaling factor to match up the values of σ_{p}^{−} with those of σ_{p} for "non-anomalous" substituents, so as to maintain comparable ρ values: for ArOH ⇄ ArO^{−} + H^{+}, we define $\sigma_p^- = \frac{1}{2.11}\log_{10}\left(\frac{K_\ce{X}}{K_\ce{H}}\right)$.

Likewise, the carbonyl carbon of a benzoic acid is at a nodal position and unable to serve as a sink for +M groups (in contrast to a carbocation at the benzylic position). Thus for reactions involving carbocations at the α-position, the σ_{p} values for electron-donating groups will appear insufficiently negative. Based on similar considerations, a set of σ_{p}^{+} constants give better fit for reactions involving electron-donating groups at the para position and the formation of a carbocation at the benzylic site. The σ_{p}^{+} are based on the rate constants of the S_{N}1 reaction of cumyl chlorides in 90% acetone/water: for ArCMe_{2}Cl + H_{2}O → ArCMe_{2}OH + HCl, we define $\sigma_p^+ = -\frac{1}{4.54}\log_{10}\left(\frac{k_\ce{X}}{k_\ce{H}}\right)$. Note that the scaling factor is negative, since an electron-donating group speeds up the reaction. For a reaction whose Hammett plot is being constructed, these alternative Hammett constants may need to be tested to see if a better linearity could be obtained.

== Rho value ==
With knowledge of substituent constants it is now possible to obtain reaction constants for a wide range of organic reactions. The archetypal reaction is the alkaline hydrolysis of ethyl benzoate (R=R'=H) in a water/ethanol mixture at 30 °C. Measurement of the reaction rate k_{0} combined with that of many substituted ethyl benzoates ultimately result in a reaction constant of +2.498.

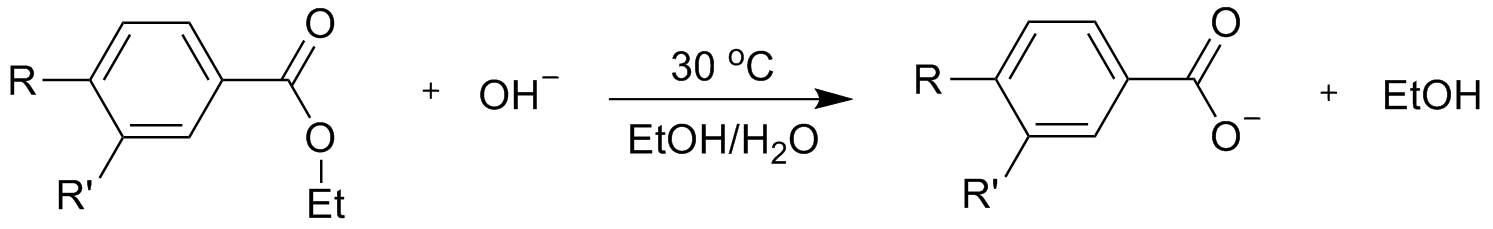
Scheme 2. Hydrolysis of benzoic acid esters

Reaction constants are known for many other reactions and equilibria. Here is a selection of those provided by Hammett himself (with their values in parentheses):

- the hydrolysis of substituted cinnamic acid ester in ethanol/water (+1.267)
- the ionization of substituted phenols in water (+2.008)
- the acid catalyzed esterification of substituted benzoic esters in ethanol (−0.085)
- the acid catalyzed bromination of substituted acetophenones (Ketone halogenation) in an acetic acid/water/hydrochloric acid (+0.417)
- the hydrolysis of substituted benzyl chlorides in acetone-water at 69.8 °C (−1.875).

The reaction constant, or sensitivity constant, ρ, describes the susceptibility of the reaction to substituents, compared to the ionization of benzoic acid. It is equivalent to the slope of the Hammett plot. Information on the reaction and the associated mechanism can be obtained based on the value obtained for ρ. If the value of:

1. ρ>1, the reaction is more sensitive to substituents than benzoic acid and negative charge is built during the reaction (or positive charge is lost).
2. 0<ρ<1, the reaction is less sensitive to substituents than benzoic acid and negative charge is built (or positive charge is lost).
3. ρ=0, no sensitivity to substituents, and no charge is built or lost.
4. ρ<0, the reaction builds positive charge (or loses negative charge).

These relations can be exploited to elucidate the mechanism of a reaction. As the value of ρ is related to the charge during the rate determining step, mechanisms can be devised based on this information. If the mechanism for the reaction of an aromatic compound is thought to occur through one of two mechanisms, the compound can be modified with substituents with different σ values and kinetic measurements taken. Once these measurements have been made, a Hammett plot can be constructed to determine the value of ρ. If one of these mechanisms involves the formation of charge, this can be verified based on the ρ value. Conversely, if the Hammett plot shows that no charge is developed, i.e. a zero slope, the mechanism involving the building of charge can be discarded.

Hammett plots may not always be perfectly linear. For instance, a curve may show a sudden change in slope, or ρ value. In such a case, it is likely that the mechanism of the reaction changes upon adding a different substituent. Other deviations from linearity may be due to a change in the position of the transition state. In such a situation, certain substituents may cause the transition state to appear earlier (or later) in the reaction mechanism.

== Dominating electronic effects ==
3 kinds of ground state or static electrical influences predominate:

- Resonance
- Inductive effect: electrical influence of a group which is transmitted primarily by polarization of the bonding electrons from one atom to the next
- Direct electrostatic (field) effect: electrical influence of a polar or dipolar substituent which is transmitted primarily to the reactive group through space (including solvent, if any) according to the laws of classical electrostatics

The latter two influences are often treated together as a composite effect, but are treated here separately. Westheimer demonstrated that the electrical effects of π-substituted dipolar groups on the acidities of benzoic and phenylacetic acids can be quantitatively correlated, by assuming only direct electrostatic action of the substituent on the ionizable proton of the carboxyl group. Westheimer's treatment worked well except for those acids with substituents that have unshared electron pairs such as –OH and –OCH3, as these substituents interact strongly with the benzene ring.

4-substituted bicyclo-2.2.2.-octane-1-carboxylic acid

Roberts and Moreland studied the reactivities of 4-substituted bicyclo[2.2.2]octane-1-carboxylic acids and esters. In such a molecule, transmission of electrical effects of substituents through the ring by resonance is not possible. Hence, this hints on the role of the π-electrons in the transmission of substituent effects through aromatic systems.

Reactivity of 4-substituted bicyclo[2.2.2]octane-1-carboxylic acids and esters were measured in 3 different processes, each of which had been previously used with the benzoic acid derivatives. A plot of log(k) against log(K_{A}) showed a linear relationship. Such linear relationships correspond to linear free energy relationships, which strongly imply that the effect of the substituents are exerted through changes of potential energy and that the steric and entropy terms remain almost constant through the series. The linear relationship fit well in the Hammett Equation. For the 4-substituted bicyclo[2.2.2.]octane-1-carboxylic acid derivatives, the substituent and reaction constants are designated σ’ and ρ’.

=== Comparison of ρ and ρ’ ===
Reaction	ρ'	ρ	D^{e}
Ionization of acids	1.464	1.464	54
Alkaline hydrolysis of ethyl esters	2.24	2.494	28
Acids with diphenyldiazomethane	0.698	0.937	24

Reactivity data indicate that the effects of substituent groups in determining the reactivities of substituted benzoic and bicyclo[2.2.2.]-octane-1-carboxylic acids are comparable. This implies that the aromatic π-electrons do not play a dominant role in the transmission of electrical effects of dipolar groups to the ionizable carboxyl group. The difference between ρ and ρ’ for the reactions of the acids with diphenylazomethane is probably due to an inverse relation to the solvent dielectric constant D^{e}.

=== Comparison of σ and σ’ ===
Substituent	σ’	σ_{para}^{c}	σ_{meta}^{c}	σ_{para} − σ’	σ_{meta} − σ’
H	0	0	0	0	0
OH	0.283	−0.341	0.014	−0.624	−0.269
CO_{2}C_{2}H_{5}	0.297	0.402	0.334	0.105	0.037
Br	0.454	0.232	0.391	−0.222	−0.063
CN	0.579	0.656	0.608	0.077	0.029

For meta-directing groups (electron withdrawing group or EWG), σ_{meta} and σ_{para} are more positive than σ’. (The superscript, c, in table denotes data from Hammett, 1940.) For ortho-para directing groups (electron donating group or EDG), σ’ more positive than σ_{meta} and σ_{para}. The difference between σ_{para} and σ’ (σ_{para} − σ’) is greater than that between σ_{meta} and σ’(σ_{meta} − σ’). This is expected as electron resonance effects are felt more strongly at the p-positions. The (σ − σ’) values can be taken as a reasonable measurement of the resonance effects.

== Nonlinearity ==
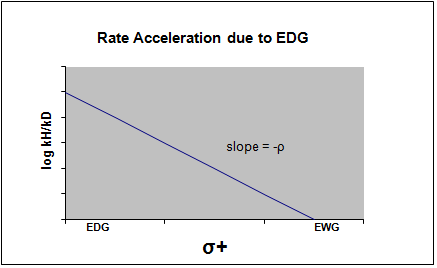
Rate acceleration EDG

The plot of the Hammett equation is typically seen as being linear, with either a positive or negative slope correlating to the value of rho. However, nonlinearity emerges in the Hammett plot when a substituent affects the rate of reaction or changes the rate-determining step or reaction mechanism of the reaction. For the reason of the former case, new sigma constants have been introduced to accommodate the deviation from linearity otherwise seen resulting from the effect of the substituent. σ+ takes into account positive charge buildup occurring in the transition state of the reaction. Therefore, an electron donating group (EDG) will accelerate the rate of the reaction by resonance stabilization and will give the following sigma plot with a negative rho value.

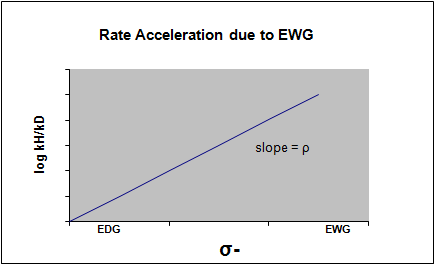
Rate acceleration EWG

σ− is designated in the case where negative charge buildup in the transition state occurs, and the rate of the reaction is consequently accelerated by electron withdrawing groups (EWG). The EWG withdraws electron density by resonance and effectively stabilizes the negative charge that is generated. The corresponding plot will show a positive rho value.

In the case of a nucleophilic acyl substitution the effect of the substituent, X, of the non-leaving group can in fact accelerate the rate of the nucleophilic addition reaction when X is an EWG. This is attributed to the resonance contribution of the EWG to withdraw electron density thereby increasing the susceptibility for nucleophilic attack on the carbonyl carbon. A change in rate occurs when X is EDG, as is evidenced when comparing the rates between X = Me and X = OMe, and nonlinearity is observed in the Hammett plot.

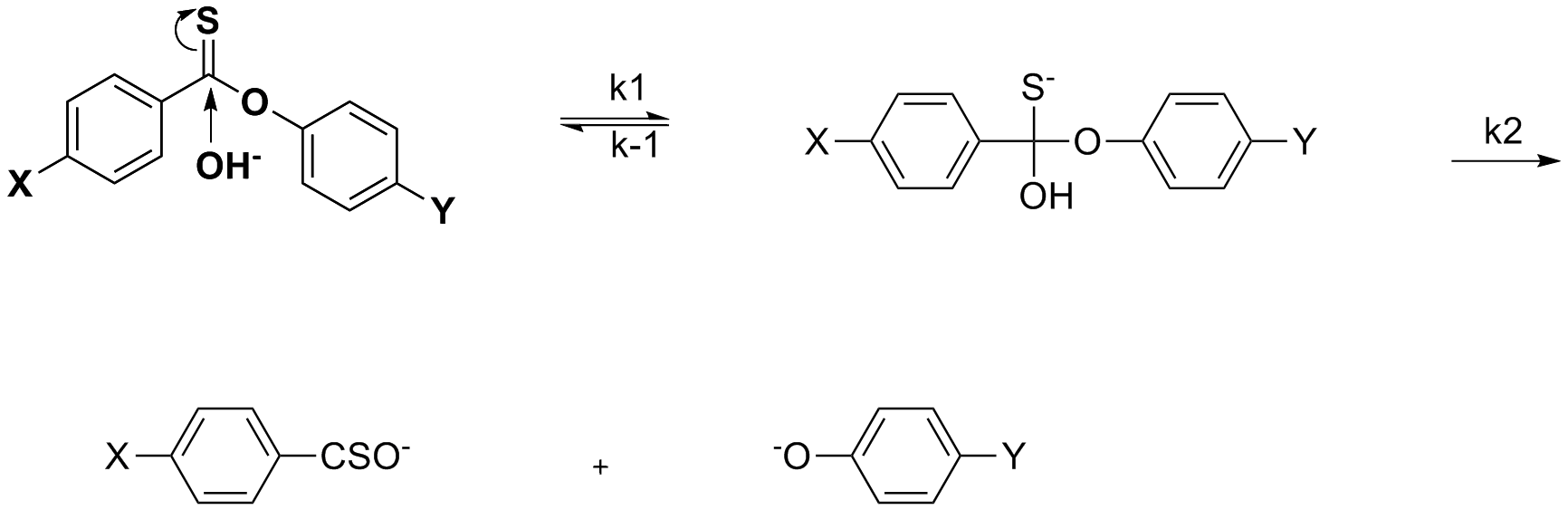

The effect of the substituent may change the rate-determining step (rds) in the mechanism of the reaction. A certain electronic effect may accelerate a certain step so that it is no longer the rds.

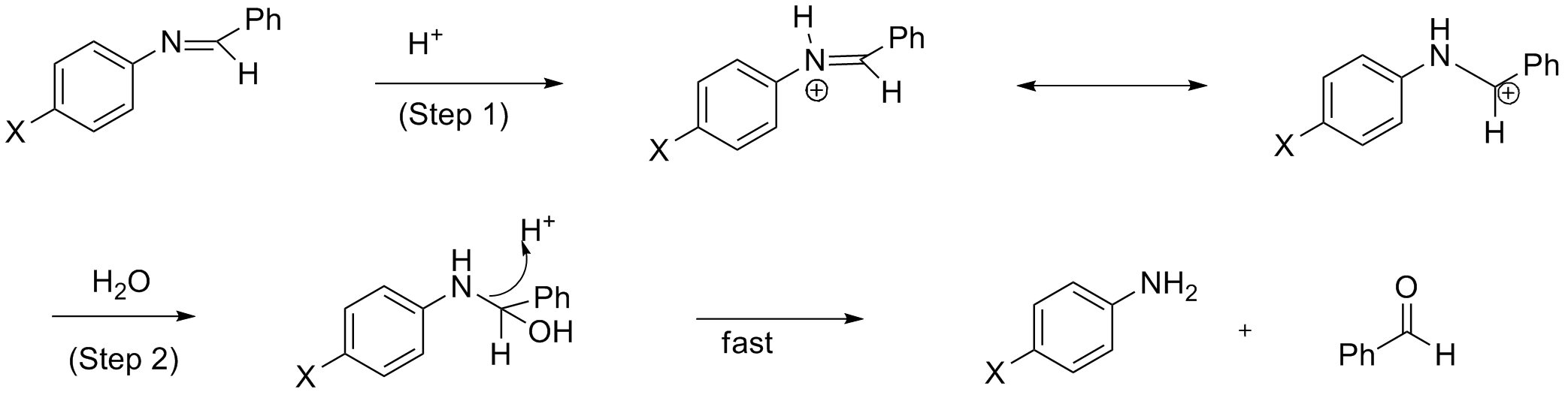

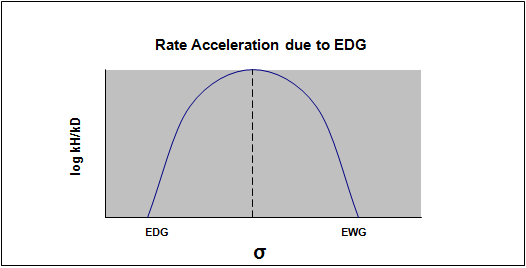
change in rate determining step

A change in the mechanism of a reaction also results in nonlinearity in the Hammett plot. Typically, the model used for measuring the changes in rate in this instance is that of the SN2 reaction. However, it has been observed that in some cases of an SN2 reaction that an EWG does not accelerate the reaction as would be expected and that the rate varies with the substituent. In fact, the sign of the charge and degree to which it develops will be affected by the substituent in the case of the benzylic system.

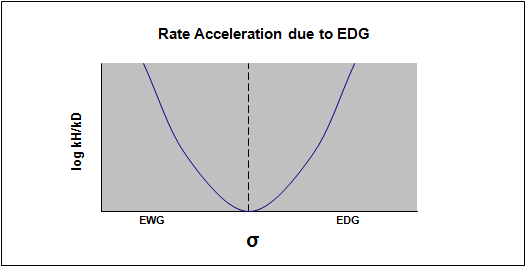
Change in emchanism

For example, the substituent may determine the mechanism to be an SN1 type reaction over a SN2 type reaction, in which case the resulting Hammett plot will indicate a rate acceleration due to an EDG, thus elucidating the mechanism of the reaction.

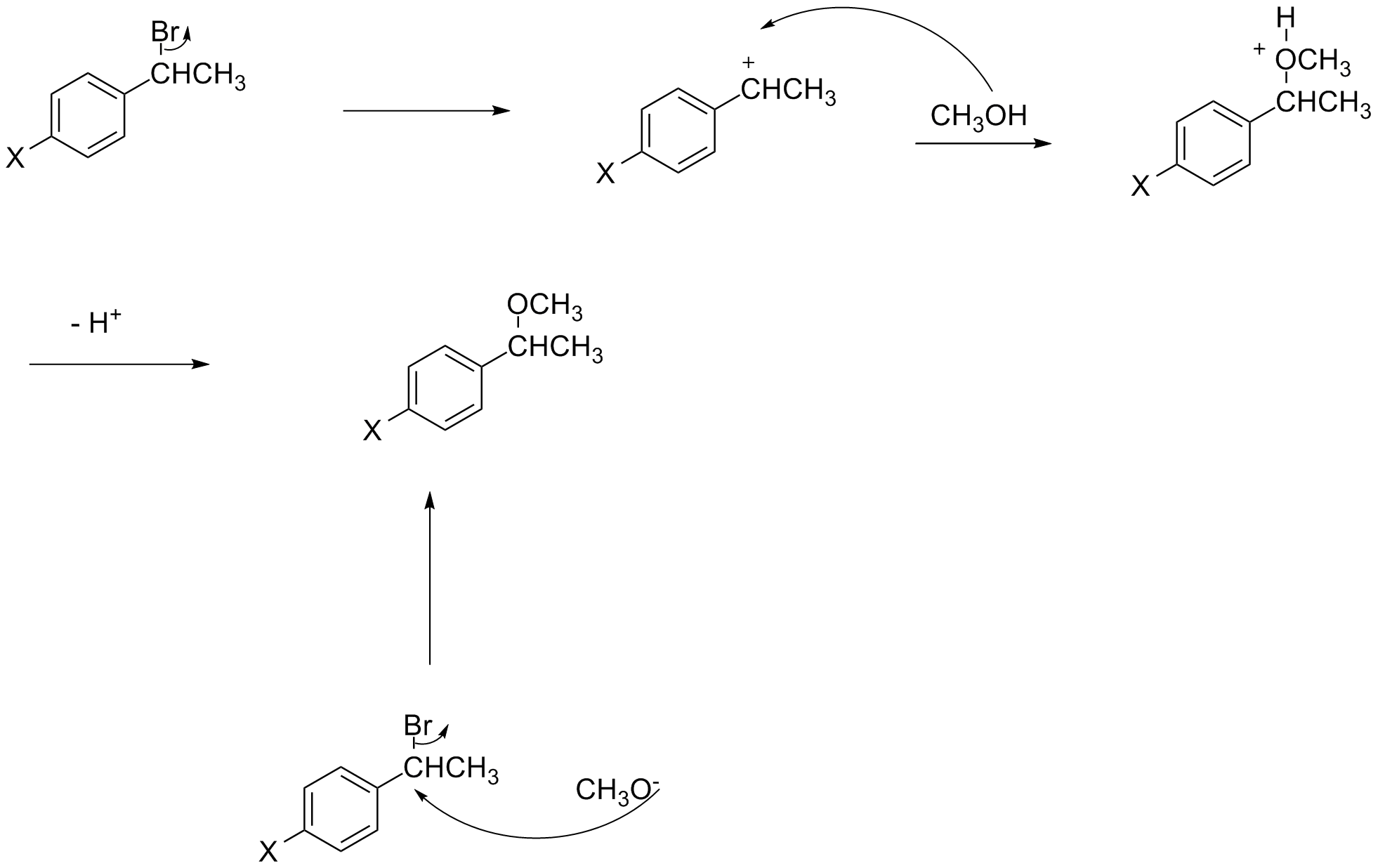

Another deviation from the regular Hammett equation is explained by the charge of nucleophile. Despite nonlinearity in benzylic SN2 reactions, electron withdrawing groups could either accelerate or retard the reaction. If the nucleophile is negatively charged (e.g. cyanide) the electron withdrawing group will increase the rate due to stabilization of the extra charge which is put on the carbon in the transition state. On the other hand, if the nucleophile is not charged (e.g. triphenylphosphine), electron withdrawing group is going to slow down the reaction by decreasing the electron density in the anti bonding orbital of leaving group in the transition state.

== Hammett modifications ==
Other equations now exist that refine the original Hammett equation: the Swain–Lupton equation, the Taft equation, the Grunwald–Winstein equation, and the Yukawa–Tsuno equation. An equation that addresses stereochemistry in aliphatic systems has also been developed.

== Estimation of Hammett sigma constants ==
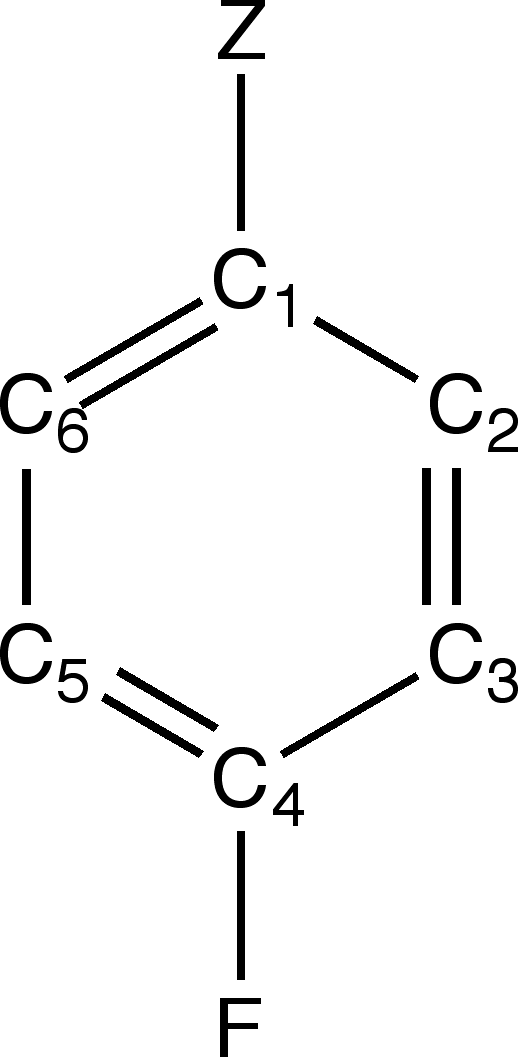

Core-electron binding energy (CEBE) shifts correlate linearly with the Hammett substituent constants (σ) in substituted benzene derivatives.

ΔCEBE ≈ κσ_{p}	1

Consider para-disubstituted benzene p-F-C_{6}H_{4}-Z, where Z is a substituent such as NH_{2}, NO_{2}, etc. The fluorine atom is para with respect to the substituent Z in the benzene ring. The image on the right shows four distinguished ring carbon atoms, C1(ipso), C2(ortho), C3(meta), C4(para) in p-F-C_{6}H_{4}-Z molecule. The carbon with Z is defined as C1(ipso) and fluorinated carbon as C4(para). This definition is followed even for Z = H. The left-hand side of (1) is called CEBE shift or ΔCEBE, and is defined as the difference between the CEBE of the fluorinated carbon atom in p-F-C_{6}H_{4}-Z and that of the fluorinated carbon in the reference molecule FC_{6}H_{5}.

ΔCEBE ≡ CEBE(C4 in p-F-C_{6}H_{4}-Z) − CEBE(C4 in p-F-C_{6}H_{5})	2

The right-hand side of Eq. 1 is a product of a parameter κ and a Hammett substituent constant at the para position, σp. The parameter κ is defined by eq. 3:

κ = 2.3kT(ρ − ρ^{*})	3

where ρ and ρ^{*} are the Hammett reaction constants for the reaction of the neutral molecule and core ionized molecule, respectively. ΔCEBEs of ring carbons in p-F-C_{6}H_{4}-Z were calculated with density functional theory to see how they correlate with Hammett σ-constants. Linear plots were obtained when the calculated CEBE shifts at the ortho, meta and para carbon were plotted against Hammett σ_{o}, σ_{m} and σ_{p} constants respectively.

- κ value calculated ≈ 1.

Hence the approximate agreement in numerical value and in sign between the CEBE shifts and their corresponding Hammett σ constant.

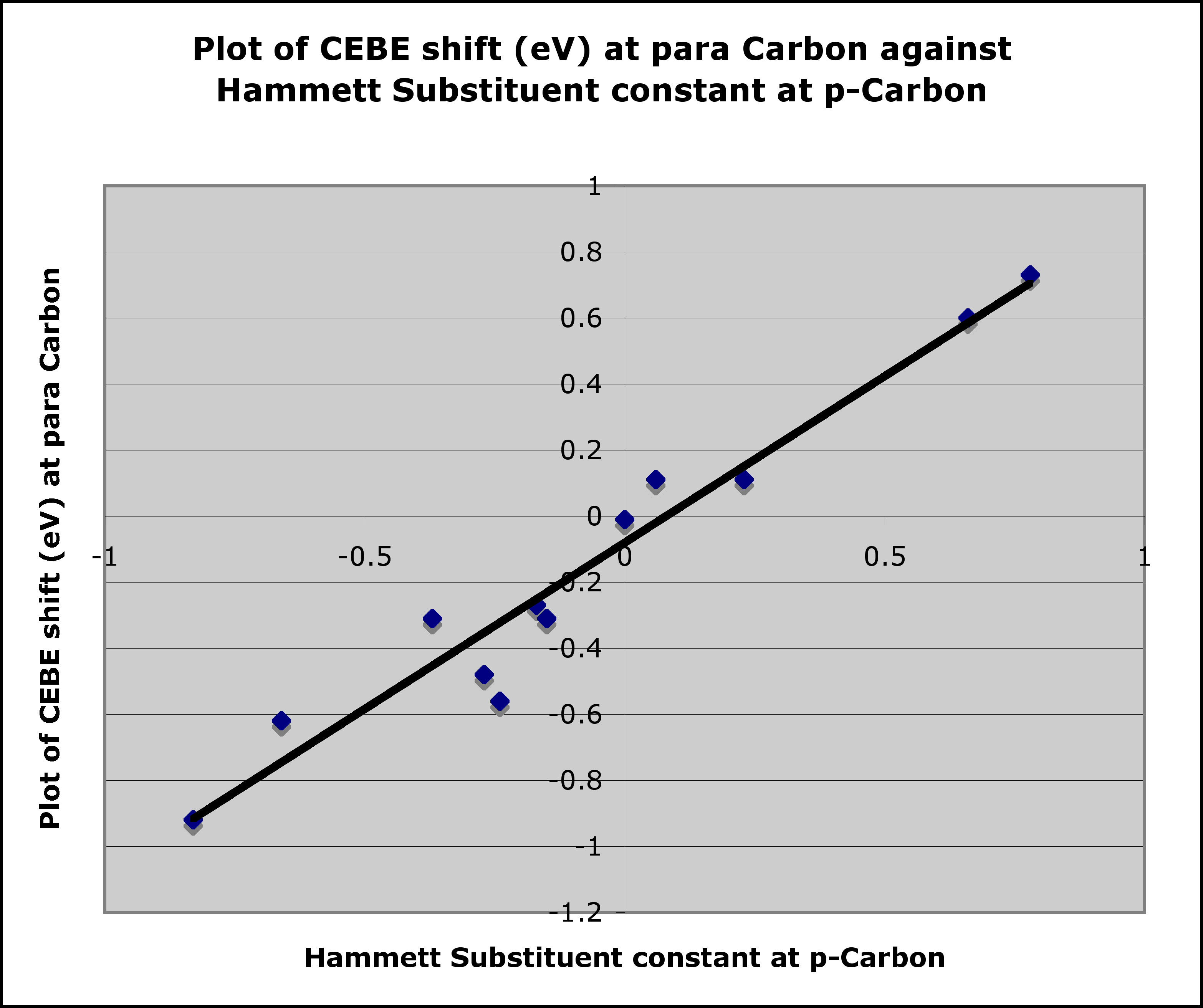
Plot of calculated CEBE shift (eV) against sigma-para

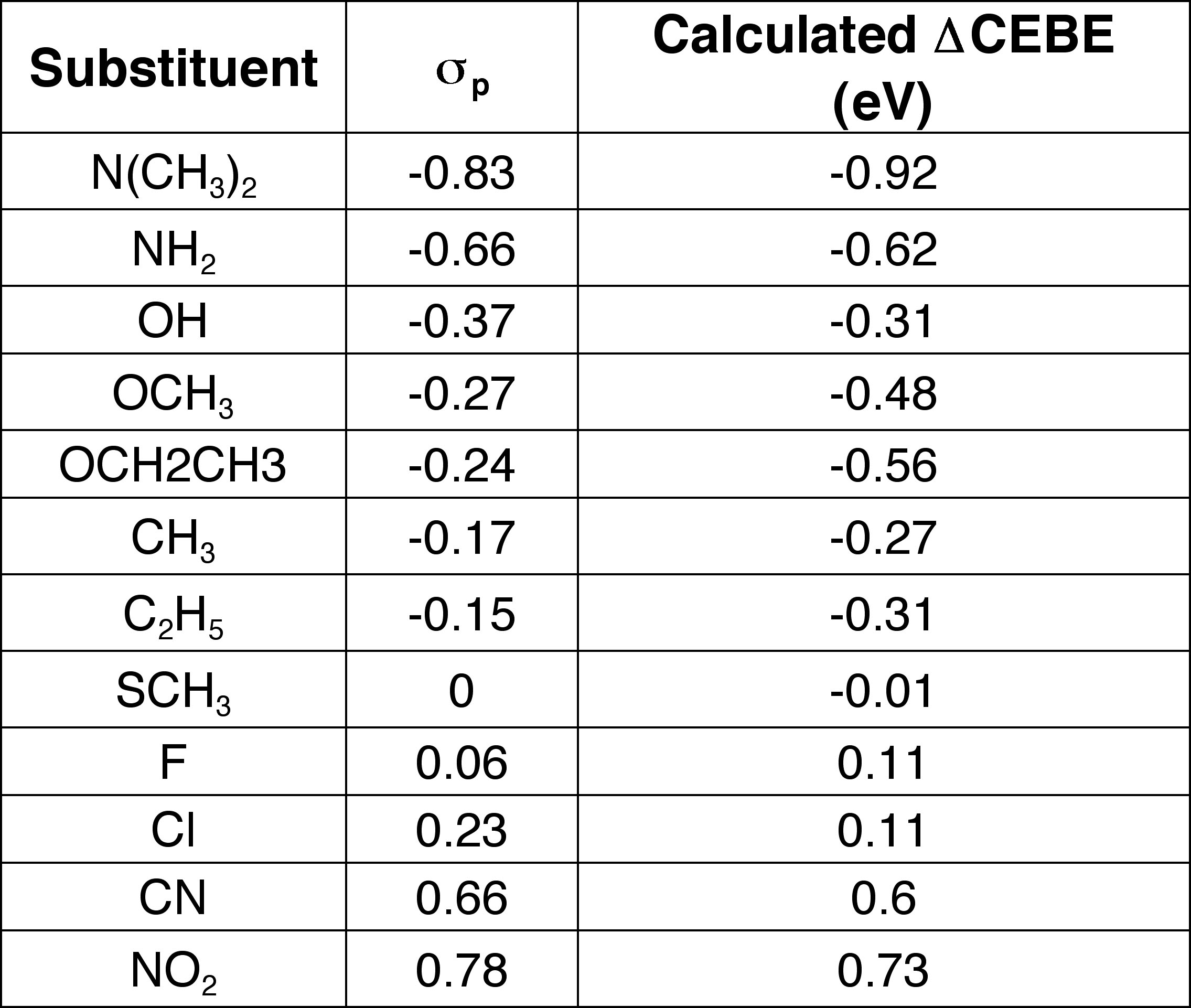
Table of CEBE shifts (eV) and sigma-para

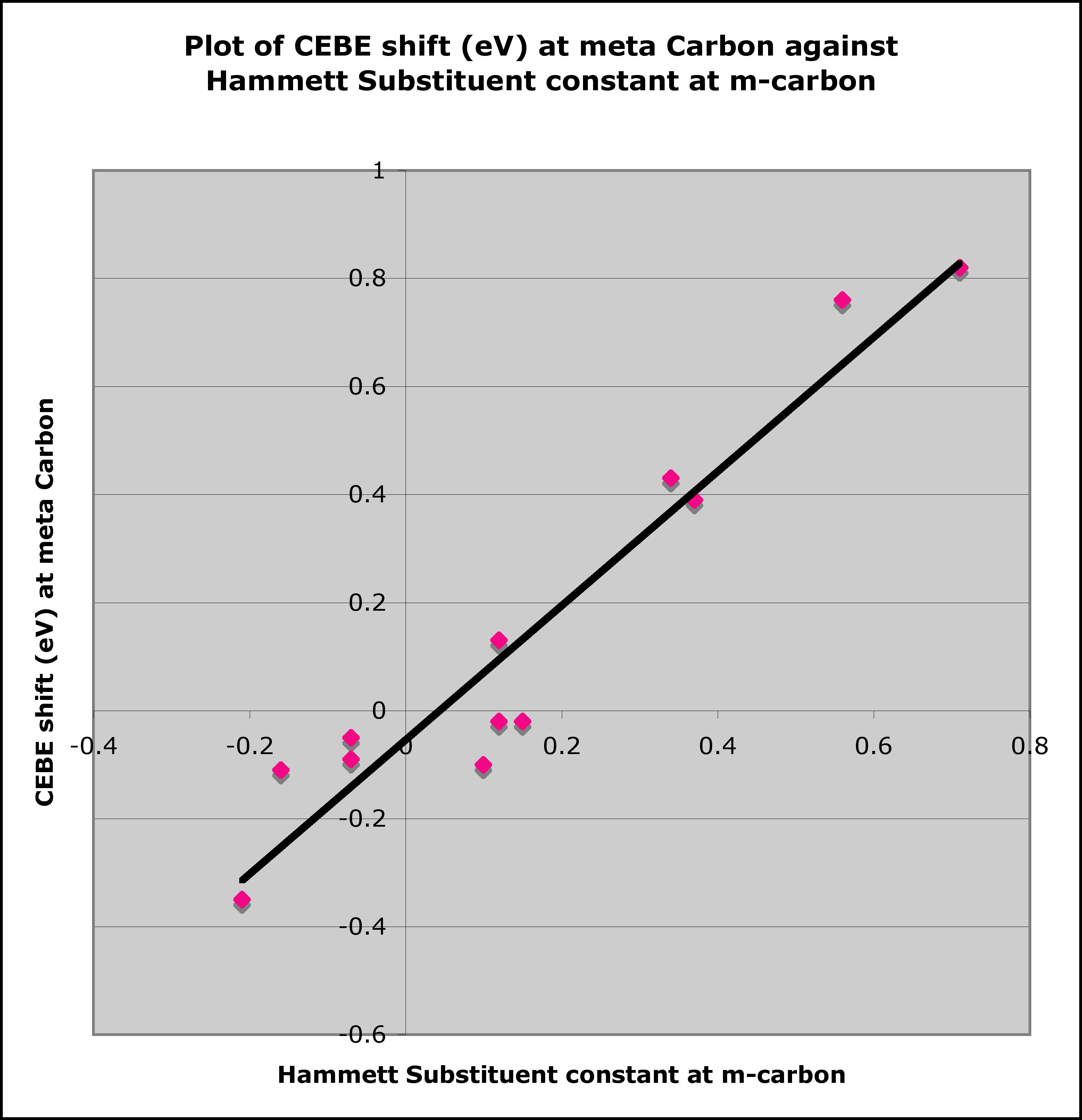
Plot of calculated CEBE shift (eV) against sigma-meta

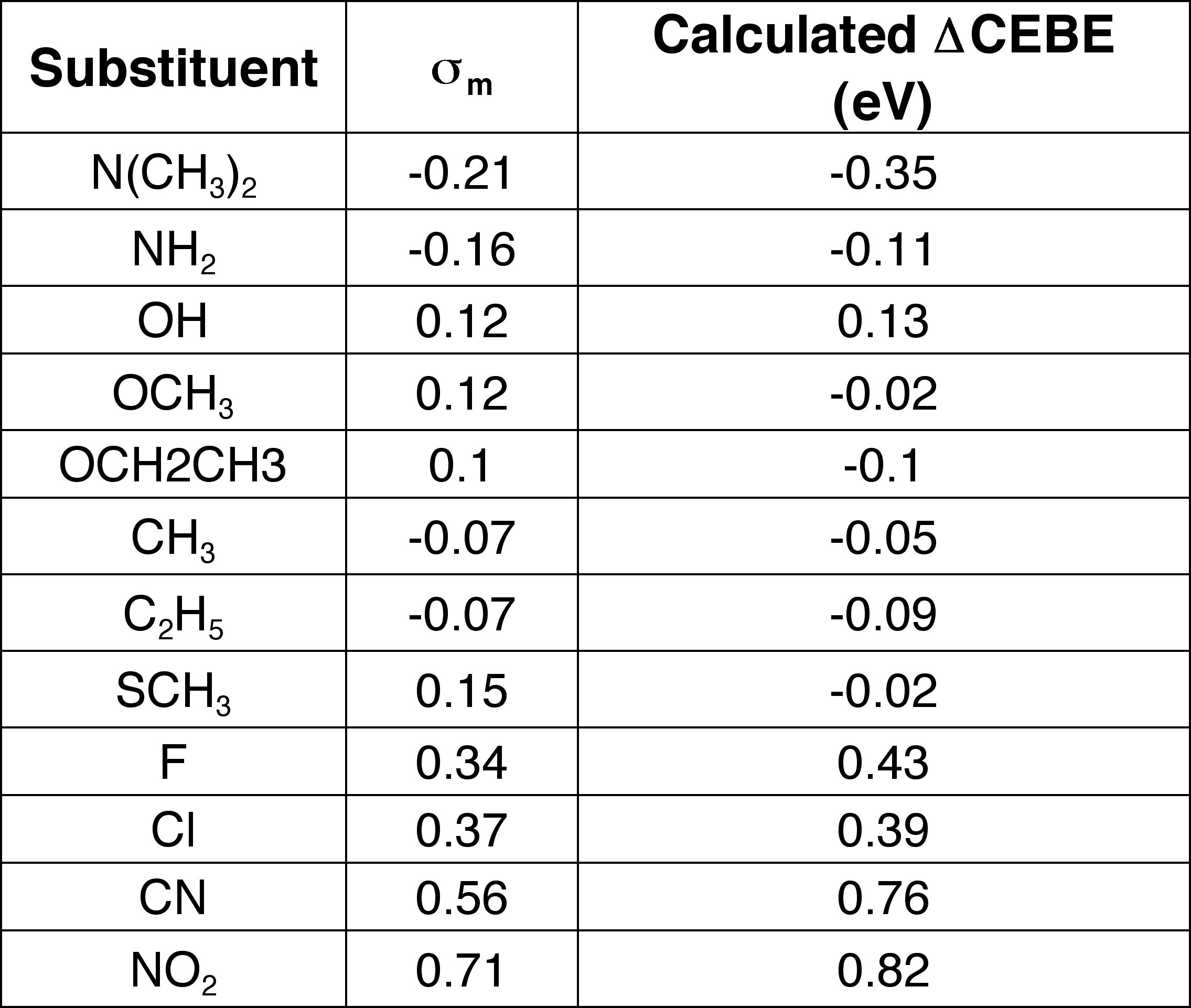
Table of CEBE shifts (eV) and sigma-meta

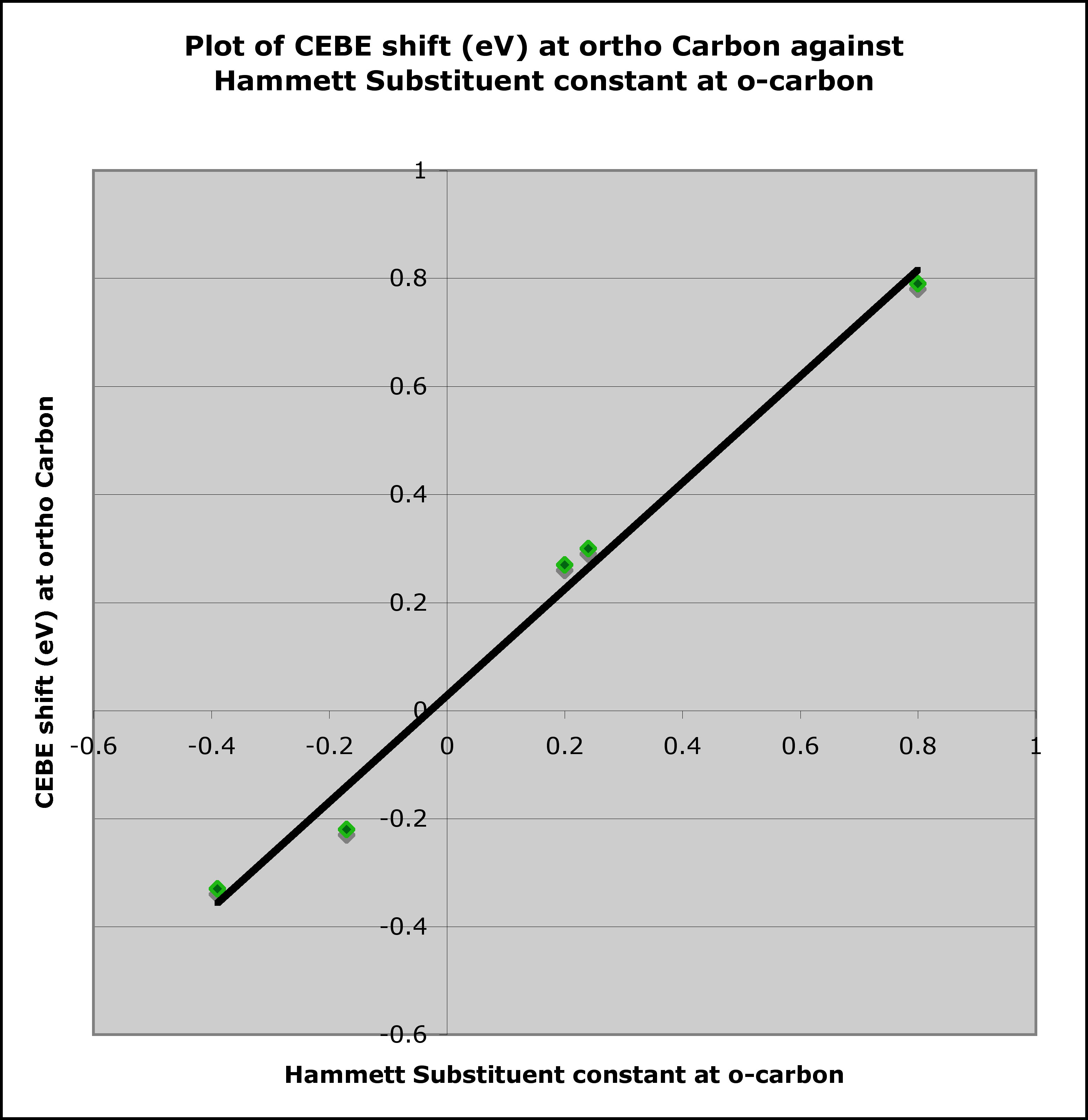
Plot of calculated CEBE shift (eV) against sigma-o

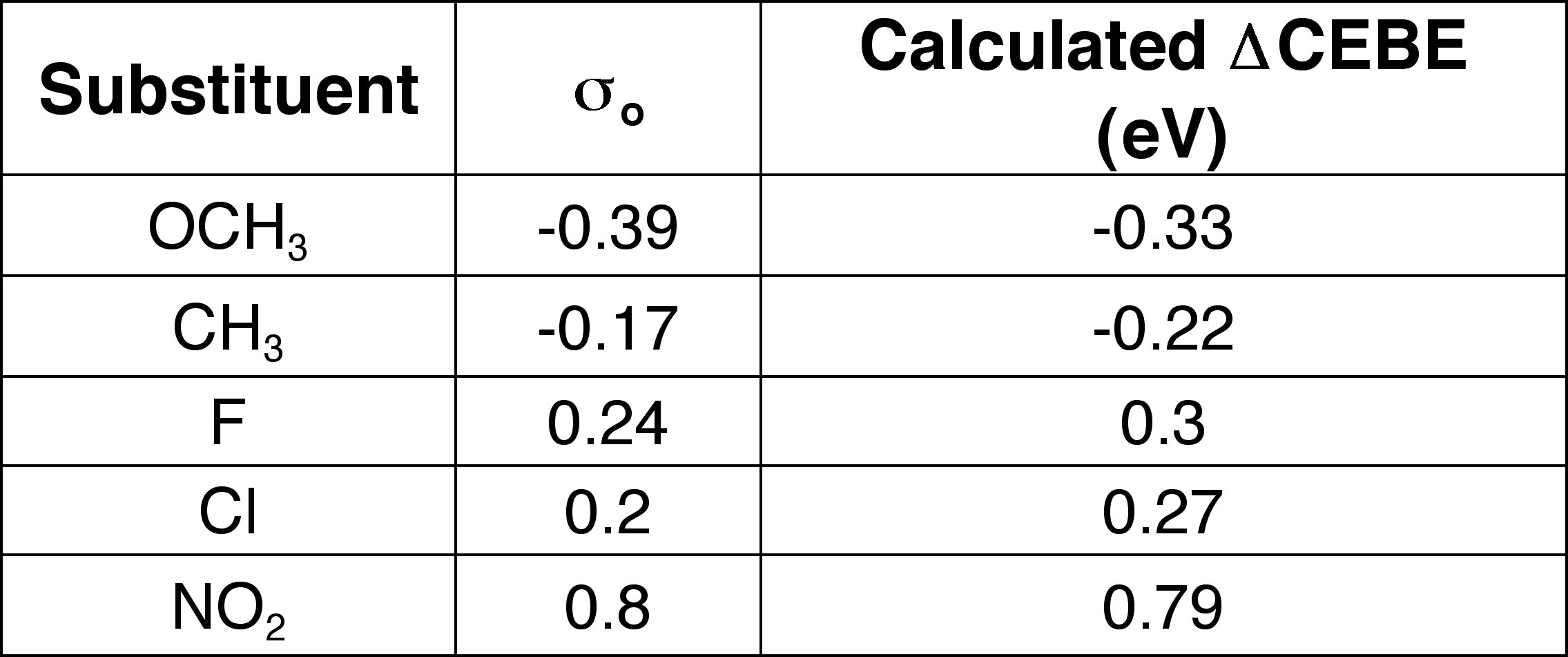
Table of CEBE shifts (eV) and sigma-ortho

== Force–work interpretation of the Hammett equation ==
A computational force–work interpretation of the Hammett equation has been proposed in terms of substituent-induced forces acting on the nuclei of the reacting substrate. This approach interprets the Hammett relationship by relating substituent effects to the mechanical work performed by forces exerted by the substituent along a reaction path. In this framework, a substituent modifies the potential energy surface of the substrate by exerting forces on its nuclei. These substituent-induced forces can be estimated computationally by replacing the substituent by hydrogen at a fixed substrate geometry and calculating the resulting nuclear forces. Their electronic component can be related to the substituent-induced change in electron density through the Hellmann–Feynman theorem.

If the substituent is not directly involved in the reaction coordinate, the change in activation energy or reaction energy can be expressed as the work performed by the average substituent-induced force along the reaction path:

$$W_R = - \langle \mathbf{F}_R(\mathbf{q}) \rangle \cdot \Delta \mathbf{q}_{\rm rx}$$

where $\langle \mathbf{F}_R(\mathbf{q}) \rangle$ is the average substituent-induced force and $\Delta \mathbf{q}_{\rm rx}$ is the reaction-path displacement. By comparing this force–work expression with the Hammett equation, the energetic term associated with the substituent effect can be written as:

$$2.303RT \log\left(\frac{k_R}{k_H}\right) =
\langle \mathbf{F}_R(\mathbf{q}) \rangle \cdot \Delta \mathbf{q}_{\rm rx}
= 2.303RT\,\sigma\rho$$

where $R$ is the gas constant, $T$ is the absolute temperature, and $k_R$ and $k_H$ are the rate constants for the substituted and unsubstituted reactions, respectively. This expression relates the Hammett product $\sigma\rho$ to the scalar product between a substituent-dependent force and a reaction-dependent displacement. In this interpretation, the substituent constant $\sigma$ can be interpreted as a relative effective force characteristic of the substituent, while the reaction constant $\rho$ can be interpreted as a relative effective reaction-path length. The approach was illustrated for the alkaline hydrolysis of substituted ethyl benzoates, for which substituent-induced forces projected along the path from the reactant to the transition state reproduced density functional theory changes in activation energy.

== See also ==
- Bell–Evans–Polanyi principle
- Craig plot
- Free-energy relationship
- pK_{a}
- Quantitative structure–activity relationship
