= Taft equation =

Equation in physical organic chemistry

Constants used in the Taft equation
Substituent	E_{s}	σ*
−H	1.24	0.49
−CH_{3}	0	0
−CH_{2}CH_{3}	−0.07	−0.1
−CH(CH_{3})_{2}	−0.47	−0.19
−C(CH_{3})_{3}	−1.54	−0.3
−CH_{2}Ph	−0.38	0.22
−Ph	−2.55	0.6

The Taft equation is a linear free energy relationship (LFER) used in physical organic chemistry in the study of reaction mechanisms and in the development of quantitative structure–activity relationships for organic compounds. It was developed by Robert W. Taft in 1952 as a modification to the Hammett equation. While the Hammett equation accounts for how field, inductive, and resonance effects influence reaction rates, the Taft equation also describes the steric effects of a substituent. The Taft equation is written as:

$$\log\left ( \frac{k_s}{k_{\ce{CH3}}} \right )= \rho^*\sigma^* + \delta E_s$$

where $\log\frac{k_s}{k_\ce{CH3}}$ is the ratio of the rate of the substituted reaction compared to the reference reaction, ρ* is the sensitivity factor for the reaction to polar effects, σ* is the polar substituent constant that describes the field and inductive effects of the substituent, δ is the sensitivity factor for the reaction to steric effects, and E_{s} is the steric substituent constant.

== Polar substituent constants, σ* ==
Polar substituent constants describe the way a substituent will influence a reaction through polar (inductive, field, and resonance) effects. To determine σ^{*} Taft studied the hydrolysis of methyl esters (RCOOMe). The use of ester hydrolysis rates to study polar effects was first suggested by Ingold in 1930. The hydrolysis of esters can occur through either acid and base catalyzed mechanisms, both of which proceed through a tetrahedral intermediate. In the base catalyzed mechanism the reactant goes from a neutral species to negatively charged intermediate in the rate determining (slow) step, while in the acid catalyzed mechanism a positively charged reactant goes to a positively charged intermediate.

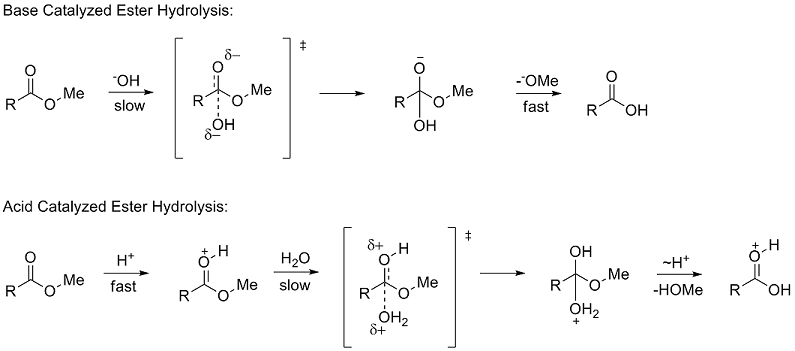

Due to the similar tetrahedral intermediates, Taft proposed that under identical conditions any steric factors should be nearly the same for the two mechanisms and therefore would not influence the ratio of the rates. However, because of the difference in charge buildup in the rate determining steps it was proposed that polar effects would only influence the reaction rate of the base catalyzed reaction since a new charge was formed. He defined the polar substituent constant σ* as:

$$\sigma^* = \left( \frac{1}{2.48\rho^*} \right )\Bigg[\log\left( \frac{k_s}{k_{\ce{CH3}}} \right )_B - \log\left( \frac{k_s}{k_{\ce{CH3}}} \right )_A \Bigg]$$

where log(k_{s}/k_{CH_{3}})_{B} is the ratio of the rate of the base catalyzed reaction compared to the reference reaction, log(k_{s}/k_{CH_{3}})_{A} is ratio of a rate of the acid catalyzed reaction compared to the reference reaction, and ρ* is a reaction constant that describes the sensitivity of the reaction series. For the definition reaction series, ρ* was set to 1 and R = methyl was defined as the reference reaction (σ* = zero). The factor of 1/2.48 is included to make σ* similar in magnitude to the Hammett σ values.

== Steric substituent constants, E_{s} ==
Although the acid catalyzed and base catalyzed hydrolysis of esters gives transition states for the rate determining steps that have differing charge densities, their structures differ only by two hydrogen atoms. Taft thus assumed that steric effects would influence both reaction mechanisms equally. Due to this, the steric substituent constant E_{s} was determined from solely the acid catalyzed reaction, as this would not include polar effects. E_{s} was defined as:

$$E_s = \frac {1}{\delta}\log\left ( \frac{k_s}{k_{\ce{CH3}}} \right )$$

where k_{s} is the rate of the studied reaction and $\ce{\mathit k_{CH3}}$ is the rate of the reference reaction (R = methyl). δ is a reaction constant that describes the susceptibility of a reaction series to steric effects. For the definition reaction series δ was set to 1 and E_{s} for the reference reaction was set to zero. This equation is combined with the equation for σ* to give the full Taft equation.

From comparing the E_{s} values for methyl, ethyl, isopropyl, and tert-butyl, it is seen that the value increases with increasing steric bulk. However, because context will have an effect on steric interactions some E_{s} values can be larger or smaller than expected. For example, the value for phenyl is much larger than that for tert-butyl. When comparing these groups using another measure of steric bulk, axial strain values, the tert-butyl group is larger.

=== Other steric parameters for LFERs ===
In addition to Taft's steric parameter E_{s}, other steric parameters that are independent of kinetic data have been defined. Charton has defined values v that are derived from van der Waals radii. Using molecular mechanics, Meyers has defined V^{a} values that are derived from the volume of the portion of the substituent that is within 0.3 nm of the reaction center.

== Sensitivity factors ==
=== Polar sensitivity factor, ρ* ===
Similar to ρ values for Hammett plots, the polar sensitivity factor ρ* for Taft plots will describe the susceptibility of a reaction series to polar effects. When the steric effects of substituents do not significantly influence the reaction rate the Taft equation simplifies to a form of the Hammett equation:

$$\log \left (\frac {k_s}{k_{\ce{CH3}}}\right ) = \rho^*\sigma^*$$

The polar sensitivity factor ρ* can be obtained by plotting the ratio of the measured reaction rates (k_{s}) compared to the reference reaction ($\ce{\mathit k_{CH3}}$) versus the σ* values for the substituents. This plot will give a straight line with a slope equal to ρ*. Similar to the Hammett ρ value:

- If ρ* > 1, the reaction accumulates negative charge in the transition state and is accelerated by electron withdrawing groups.
- If 1 > ρ* > 0, negative charge is built up and the reaction is mildly sensitive to polar effects.
- If ρ* = 0, the reaction is not influenced by polar effects.
- If 0 > ρ* > −1, positive charge is built up and the reaction is mildly sensitive to polar effects.
- If −1 > ρ*, the reaction accumulates positive charge and is accelerated by electron donating groups.

=== Steric sensitivity factor, δ ===
Similar to the polar sensitivity factor, the steric sensitivity factor δ for a new reaction series will describe to what magnitude the reaction rate is influenced by steric effects. When a reaction series is not significantly influenced by polar effects, the Taft equation reduces to:

$$\log \left (\frac {k_s}{k_{\ce{CH3}}}\right ) = \delta E_s$$

A plot of the ratio of the rates versus the E_{s} value for the substituent will give a straight line with a slope equal to δ. Similarly to the Hammett ρ value, the magnitude of δ will reflect to what extent a reaction is influenced by steric effects:

- A very steep slope will correspond to high steric sensitivity, while a shallow slope will correspond to little to no sensitivity.

Since E_{s} values are large and negative for bulkier substituents, it follows that:

- If δ is positive, increasing steric bulk decreases the reaction rate and steric effects are greater in the transition state.
- If δ is negative, increasing steric bulk increases the reaction rate and steric effects are lessened in the transition state.

=== Reactions influenced by polar and steric effects ===
When both steric and polar effects influence the reaction rate the Taft equation can be solved for both ρ* and δ through the use of standard least squares methods for determining a bivariant regression plane. Taft outlined the application of this method to solving the Taft equation in a 1957 paper.

== Taft plots in QSAR ==
The Taft equation is often employed in biological chemistry and medicinal chemistry for the development of quantitative structure–activity relationships (QSARs). In a recent example, Sandri and co-workers have used Taft plots in studies of polar effects in the aminolysis of β-lactams. They have looked at the binding of β-lactams to a poly(ethyleneimine) polymer, which functions as a simple mimic for human serum albumin (HSA). The formation of a covalent bond between penicillins and HSA as a result of aminolysis with lysine residues is believed to be involved in penicillin allergies. As a part of their mechanistic studies Sandri and co-workers plotted the rate of aminolysis versus calculated σ* values for 6 penicillins and found no correlation, suggesting that the rate is influenced by other effects in addition to polar and steric effects.

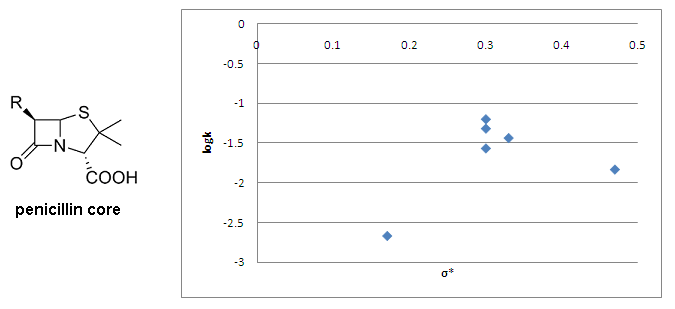

== See also ==
- Free-energy relationship
- Hammett equation
- Quantitative structure–activity relationship
