= Bell–Evans–Polanyi principle =

Principle in physical chemistry

In physical chemistry, the Evans–Polanyi principle (also referred to as the Bell–Evans–Polanyi principle, Brønsted–Evans–Polanyi principle, or Evans–Polanyi–Semenov principle) observes that the difference in activation energy between two reactions of the same family is proportional to the difference of their enthalpy of reaction.

This relationship can be expressed as

$$E_\text{a} = E_0 + \alpha \Delta H,$$

where

$E_0$ is the activation energy of a reference reaction of the same class,
$\Delta H$ is the enthalpy of reaction,
$\alpha$ characterizes the position of the transition state along the reaction coordinate (such that $0 \leq \alpha \leq 1$).

The Evans–Polanyi model is a linear energy relationship that serves as an efficient way to calculate activation energy of many reactions within a distinct family. The activation energy may be used to characterize the kinetic rate parameter of a given reaction through application of the Arrhenius equation.

The Evans–Polanyi model assumes that the pre-exponential factor of the Arrhenius equation and the position of the transition state along the reaction coordinate are the same for all reactions belonging to a particular reaction family.

== See also ==
- Hammond's postulate
- Free-energy relationship
- Brønsted catalysis equation
- Catalytic resonance theory
