= 2-Hydroxy-3-morpholinopropanesulfonic acid =

MOPSO
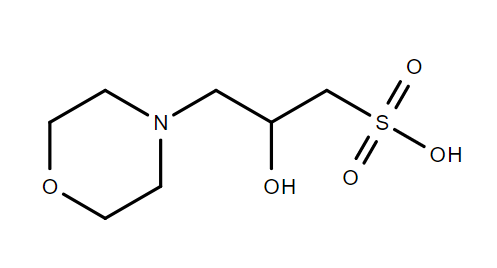
- Chemical structure of MOPSO

Names
- Preferred IUPAC name 2-Hydroxy-3-(morpholin-4-yl)propane-1-sulfonic acid
- Other names MOPSO, 3-morpholino-2-hydroxypropanesulfonic acid, 3-morpholino-2HOPSA

Identifiers
CAS Number	68399-77-9
3D model (JSmol)	Interactive image
ChEBI	CHEBI:190979
ChemSpider	98300
ECHA InfoCard	100.063.607
EC Number	269-989-6
PubChem CID	109333
UNII	6XB7PS9THL
CompTox Dashboard (EPA)	DTXSID40887352
- InChI: InChI=1S/C7H15NO5S/c9-7(6-14(10,11)12)5-8-1-3-13-4-2-8/h7,9H,1-6H2,(H,10,11,12) Key: NUFBIAUZAMHTSP-UHFFFAOYSA-N
- SMILES: C1COCCN1CC(CS(=O)(=O)O)O

Properties
Chemical formula	C_{7}H_{15}NO_{5}S
Molar mass	225.259 g/mol
Appearance	White crystalline powder
Melting point	270–290 °C (518–554 °F; 543–563 K)
Acidity (pK_{a})	6.9

Hazards
- Occupational safety and health (OHS/OSH)
Main hazards	Irritant
- GHS labelling
Pictograms	(GHS07: Exclamation mark)
Signal word	Warning
Hazard statements	H315, H319, H335
Precautionary statements	P261, P264, P271, P280, P302+P352, P304+P340, P305+P351+P338, P312, P321, P332+P313, P337+P313, P362, P403+P233, P405, P501
Flash point	Non-flammable
- Except where otherwise noted, data are given for materials in their standard state (at 25 °C [77 °F], 100 kPa). Infobox references

MOPSO is a zwitterionic organic chemical buffering agent; one of Good's buffers. MOPSO and MOPS (3-morpholinopropanesulfonic acid) are chemically similar, differing only in the presence of a hydroxyl group on the C-2 of the propane moiety. It has a useful pH range of 6.5-7.9 in the physiological range, making it useful for cell culture work. It has a pKa of 6.9 with ΔpKa/°C of -0.015 and a solubility in water at 0°C of 0.75 M.

MOPSO has been used as a buffer component for:

- Copper analysis via:
  - Flow injection micellar technique of the catalytic reaction of 3-methyl-2-benzothiazolinone hydrazone and N-ethyl-N-(2-hydroxy-3-sulfopropyl)-3,5-dimethoxyaniline
  - Electrospray ionization quadrupole time-of-flight mass spectroscopy to measure MOPSO-copper chelated complexes
- Discontinuous gel electrophoresis on rehydratable polyacrylamide gels
- Buffered charcoal yeast extract agar
- Fixing cells in urine in a buffered alcohol
- Testing crude oil bioremediation products in marine environments

== See also ==
- MOPS
- MES
- CAPS
- CHES
