= Particle-induced X-ray emission =

Non-destructive elemental analysis technique

Particle-induced X-ray emission or proton-induced X-ray emission (PIXE) is a technique used for determining the elemental composition of a material or a sample. When a material is exposed to an ion beam, atomic interactions occur that give off EM radiation of wavelengths in the X-ray part of the electromagnetic spectrum specific to an element. PIXE is a powerful, yet non-destructive elemental analysis technique now used routinely by geologists, archaeologists, art conservators and others to help answer questions of provenance, dating and authenticity.

The technique was first proposed in 1970 by Sven Johansson of Lund University, Sweden, and developed over the next few years with his colleagues Roland Akselsson and Thomas B Johansson.

Recent extensions of PIXE using tightly focused beams (down to 1 μm) gives the additional capability of microscopic analysis. This technique, called microPIXE, can be used to determine the distribution of trace elements in a wide range of samples. A related technique, particle-induced gamma-ray emission (PIGE) can be used to detect some light elements.

Additionally, there is a multiplexed instrument combining PIXE with mass spectrometry of molecules: PDI-PIXE-MS or PIXE-MS.

== Theory ==
Three types of spectra can be collected from a PIXE experiment:

1. X-ray emission spectrum.
2. Rutherford backscattering spectrum.
3. Proton transmission spectrum.

=== X-ray emission ===
Quantum theory states that orbiting electrons of an atom must occupy discrete energy levels in order to be stable. Bombardment with ions of sufficient energy (usually MeV protons) produced by an ion accelerator, will cause inner shell ionisation of atoms in a specimen. Outer shell electrons drop down to replace inner shell vacancies; however, only certain transitions are allowed. X-rays of a characteristic energy of the element are emitted. An energy-dispersive detector is used to record and measure these X-rays.

Only elements heavier than fluorine can be detected. The lower detection limit for a PIXE beam is given by the ability of the X-rays to pass through the window between the chamber and the X-ray detector. The upper limit is given by the ionisation cross section, the probability of the K electron shell ionisation, is maximal when the velocity of the proton matches the velocity of the electron (10% of the speed of light), therefore 3 MeV proton beams are optimal.

=== Proton backscattering ===
Protons can also interact with the nucleus of the atoms in the sample through elastic collisions, Rutherford backscattering, often repelling the proton at angles close to 180 degrees. The backscatter give information on the sample thickness and composition. The bulk sample properties allow for the correction of X-ray photon loss within the sample.

=== Proton transmission ===
The transmission of protons through a sample can also be used to get information about the sample. Channeling is one of the processes that can be used to study crystals.

== Applications ==
=== Artifact analysis ===
MicroPIXE is a useful technique for the non-destructive analysis of paintings and antiques. Although it provides only an elemental analysis, it can be used to distinguish and measure layers within the thickness of an artifact. The technique is comparable with destructive techniques such as the inductively coupled plasma (ICP) family of analyses.

=== Cell and tissue analysis ===
Whole cell and tissue analysis is possible using a microPIXE beam. This method is also referred to as nuclear microscopy.

=== Protein analysis ===
Protein analysis using microPIXE allow for the determination of the elemental composition of liquid and crystalline proteins. microPIXE can quantify the metal content of protein molecules with a relative accuracy of between 10% and 20%.

The advantage of microPIXE is that given a protein of known sequence, the X-ray emission from sulfur can be used as an internal standard to calculate the number of metal atoms per protein monomer. Because only relative concentrations are calculated there are only minimal systematic errors, and the results are totally internally consistent.

The relative concentrations of DNA to protein (and metals) can also be measured using the phosphate groups of the bases as an internal calibration.

=== Proton beam writing ===
Proton beams can be used for writing (proton beam writing) through either the hardening of a polymer (by proton induced cross-linking), or through the degradation of a proton sensitive material. This may have important effects in the field of nanotechnology.

=== Scanning ===
Two-dimensional maps of elemental compositions can be generated by scanning the microPIXE beam across the target.

== PDI-PIXE-MS ==
Particle desorption ionisation particle-induced X-ray emission mass spectrometry (PIXE-MS) is a technique which combines PIXE with mass spectrometry of molecules. Elemental determinations are performed by PIXE with a heavy ion, such as oxygen, while simultaneously collecting the molecular ions for mass analysis in a quadrupole mass spectrometer, or time-of-flight (TOF) instrument. ICP-MS only determines elemental constituents using mass spectrometry, not molecular information. Sequential scanning may be done with a hydrogen ion beam and then a heavy ion beam to desorb and ionise the analyte sample. This technique allows for the analysis of both the elemental constituents as well as the molecular ions, or molecular speciation, present in a sample, using a heavy ion beam. This makes use, typically, of a 4 MeV accelerator with samples prepared in glycerol, on carbon felt.

== Data analysis ==
Analysis of the data collected can be performed by the programs Dan32, the front end to gupix.

== Limitations ==
In order to get a meaningful sulfur signal from the analysis, the buffer should not contain sulfur (i.e. no BES, DDT, HEPES, MES, MOPSO or PIPES compounds). Excessive amounts of chlorine in the buffer should also be avoided, since this will overlap with the sulfur peak; KBr and NaBr are suitable alternatives.

Due to the low penetration depth of protons and heavy charged particles, PIXE is limited to analyzing the top micrometre of a given sample.

== Advantages ==
There are many advantages to using a proton beam over an electron beam. There is less crystal charging from Bremsstrahlung radiation, although there is some from the emission of Auger electrons, and there is significantly less than if the primary beam was itself an electron beam.

Because of the higher mass of protons relative to electrons, there is less lateral deflection of the beam; this is important for proton beam writing applications.
