= Simulated body fluid =

Medical product

A simulated body fluid (SBF) is a solution with an ion concentration close to that of human blood plasma, kept under mild conditions of pH and identical physiological temperature. SBF was first introduced by Kokubo et al. in order to evaluate the changes on a surface of a bioactive glass ceramic. Later, cell culture media (such as DMEM, MEM, α-MEM, etc.), in combination with some methodologies adopted in cell culture, were proposed as an alternative to conventional SBF in assessing the bioactivity of materials.

== Applications ==
=== Surface modification of metallic implants ===
For an artificial material to bond to living bone, the formation of bonelike apatite layer on the surface of an implant is of significant importance. The SBF can be used as an in vitro testing method to study the formation of apatite layer on the surface of implants so as to predict their in vivo bone bioactivity. The consumption of calcium and phosphate ions, present in the SBF solution, results in the spontaneous growth of bone-like apatite nuclei on the surface of biomaterials in vitro. Therefore, the apatite formation on the surface of biomaterials, soaked in the SBF solution, is considered a successful development of novel bioactive materials. The SBF technique for surface modification of metallic implants is usually a time-consuming process, and obtaining uniform apatite layers on substrates takes at least 7 days, with daily refreshing of the SBF solution. Another approach for decreasing the coating time is to concentrate the calcium and phosphate ions in the SBF solution. Enhanced concentration of calcium and phosphate ions in SBF solution accelerates the coating process and, in the meantime, eliminates the need for regular replenishment of the SBF solution.

=== Gene delivery ===
An attempt was made to investigate the application of SBF in gene delivery. Calcium phosphate nanoparticles, required for the delivery of plasmid DNA (pDNA) into the nucleus of the cells, were synthesized in a SBF solution and mixed with pDNA. The in vitro studies showed higher gene delivery efficiency for the calcium-phosphate/DNA complexes made of SBF solution than for the complexes prepared in pure water (as control).

== Formulation ==
Ionic concentrations (mM) of blood plasma and proposed SBF formulations
Formulation	Na^{+}	K^{+}	Mg^{2+}	Ca^{2+}	Cl^{−}	HCO^{−}_{3}	HPO^{2−}_{4}	SO^{2−}_{4}	Buffer
Blood plasma	142.0	5.0	1.5	2.5	103.0	27.0	1.0	0.5	-
Original SBF	142.0	5.0	1.5	2.5	148.8	4.2	1.0	0	Tris
Corrected (c-SBF)	142.0	5.0	1.5	2.5	147.8	4.2	1.0	0.5	Tris
Tas-SBF	142.0	5.0	1.5	2.5	125.0	27.0	1.0	0.5	Tris
Bigi-SBF	141.5	5.0	1.5	2.5	124.5	27.0	1.0	0.5	HEPES
Revised (r-SBF)	142.0	5.0	1.5	2.5	103.0	27.0	1.0	0.5	HEPES
Modified (m-SBF)	142.0	5.0	1.5	2.5	103.0	10.0	1.0	0.5	HEPES
Ionized (i-SBF)	142.0	5.0	1.0	1.6	103.0	27.0	1.0	0.5	HEPES
Improved (n-SBF)	142.0	5.0	1.5	2.5	103.0	4.2	1.0	0.5	Tris
