= HEPBS =

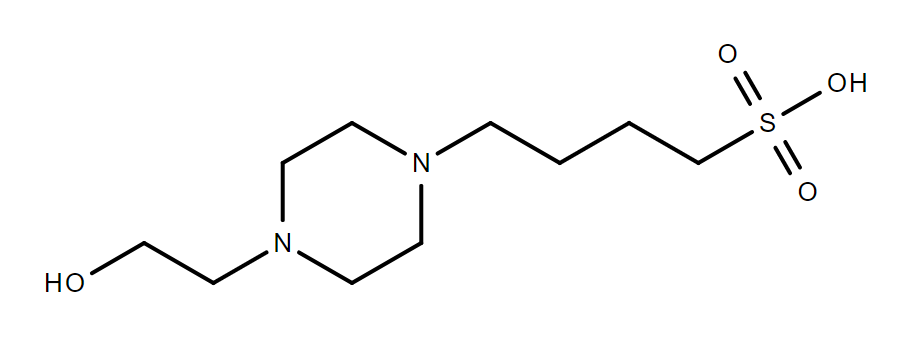
- Chemical structure of HEPBS

Names
- Preferred IUPAC name 4-[4-(2-Hydroxyethyl)piperazin-1-yl]butane-1-sulfonic acid
- Other names HEPBS

Identifiers
CAS Number	161308-36-7
3D model (JSmol)	Interactive image
ChemSpider	8140784
ECHA InfoCard	100.157.294
EC Number	629-081-6
PubChem CID	9965191
CompTox Dashboard (EPA)	DTXSID20433437
- InChI: InChI=1S/C10H22N2O4S/c13-9-8-12-6-4-11(5-7-12)3-1-2-10-17(14,15)16/h13H,1-10H2,(H,14,15,16) Key: LOJNFONOHINEFI-UHFFFAOYSA-N
- SMILES: C1CN(CCN1CCCCS(=O)(=O)O)CCO

Properties
Chemical formula	C_{10}H_{22}N_{2}O_{4}S
Molar mass	266.356 g/mol
Appearance	White crystalline powder
Density	1.25 g/cm^{3} (predicted)
Melting point	211–216 °C (412–421 °F; 484–489 K)
Acidity (pK_{a})	8.3

Hazards
- Occupational safety and health (OHS/OSH)
Main hazards	Irritant
- GHS labelling
Pictograms	(GHS07: Exclamation mark)
Signal word	Warning
Hazard statements	H315, H319, H335
Precautionary statements	P261, P264, P271, P280, P302+P352, P304+P340, P305+P351+P338, P312, P321, P332+P313, P337+P313, P362, P403+P233, P405, P501
Flash point	Non-flammable
- Except where otherwise noted, data are given for materials in their standard state (at 25 °C [77 °F], 100 kPa). Infobox references

HEPBS (N-(2-Hydroxyethyl)piperazine-N'-(4-butanesulfonic acid)) is a zwitterionic organic chemical buffering agent; one of Good's buffers. HEPBS and HEPES have very similar structures and properties, HEPBS also having an acidity (pK_{a}) in the physiological range (7.6-9.0 useful range). This makes it possible to use it for cell culture work.

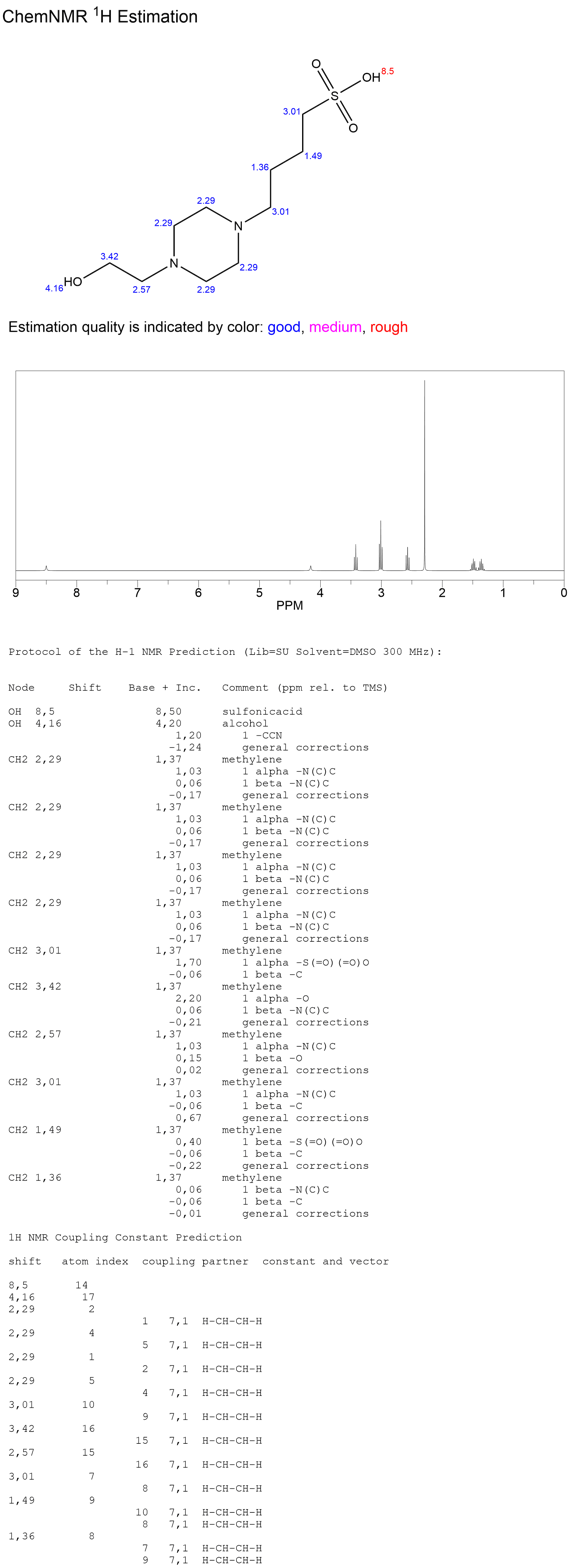
HEPBS ^{1}H NMR spectrum.
