= HEPPS =

HEPPS may refer to:

- Heptaprenyl diphosphate synthase, an enzyme
- HEPPS (molecule), a compound commonly used as a buffering agent
