= Legionella jordanis =

Scientific classification
- Domain: Bacteria
- Kingdom: Pseudomonadati
- Phylum: Pseudomonadota
- Class: Gammaproteobacteria
- Order: Legionellales
- Family: Legionellaceae
- Genus: Legionella
- Species: L. jordanis

Binomial name
- Legionella jordanis Cherry et al. 1982

Type strain
- ATCC 33623, BL-540, CCUG 16413, CIP 105268, DSM 19212, Gorman BL-540, NCTC 11533

Species of bacterium

Legionella jordanis is a Gram-negative bacterium from the genus Legionella which was isolated from the Jordan River in Bloomington, Indiana and from the sewage in DeKalb County, Georgia. L. jordanis is a rare human pathogen and can cause respiratory tract infections.

== History ==
Legionella jordanis strain BL-540 was first isolated from water samples taken at the Jordan River in Bloomington, Indiana by Cherry et al. in 1978. Another strain characterized as ABB-9 was discovered in 1980 from sewage collected in DeKalb County, Georgia. The specific epithet jordanis was derived from the name of the river in which was discovered. The two strains were both Gram-stained. The Sudan black B fat stain for lipids and the Wirtz-Conklin method were used to demonstrate spore formation. Acid-fast staining was used, as well. The cultures were streaked onto trypticase soy agar (TSA) and charcoal yeast extract (CYE) agar slants, and were left to incubate around 36 °C in candle extinction jars that remove oxygen from the jar by burning a candle with the lid tightly sealed. The cultures failed to grow on the TSA plates, but did show growth on CYE slants which Cherry et al. expected. They were removed at 24- and 48-hour periods and tested for oxidase and catalase production.

== Characterization ==
The order Legionellales comprises two families, Legionellaceae and Coxiellaceae. The family Legionellaceae includes the genera Legionella and relatives Fluoribacter and Sarcobium. The colonies that appeared around the third day in the CYE slants were grey and raised with a “ground-glass appearance". It was positive for both oxidase and catalase production. Strains of L. jordanis are thin, motile Gram-negative rods that range in size from 0.3 to 0.9 μm wide by 2 to 20 μm long. In addition, it is not encapsulated or non-spore-forming. After being stained with Sudan B, many of the cells did not have fat deposits. Gas-liquid chromatography-mass spectrometry show that all known species of Legionella contain large amounts of branched-chain fatty acids. DNA that was unlabeled from BL-540 was tested against labeled DNAs from the six recognized Legionella species. When reactions were performed at an incubation temperature of 60 °C, relatedness of BL-540 to the other DNAs were between 4 and 20%. When reactions were performed at a higher incubation temperature of 75 °C, the relatedness ranged from 0 to 10%. The results indicated that L. jordanis was a new species. The two strains, BL-540 and ABB-9, were almost identical when DNA relatedness reactions were performed at both 60 and 75 °C.

== Pathogenesis ==
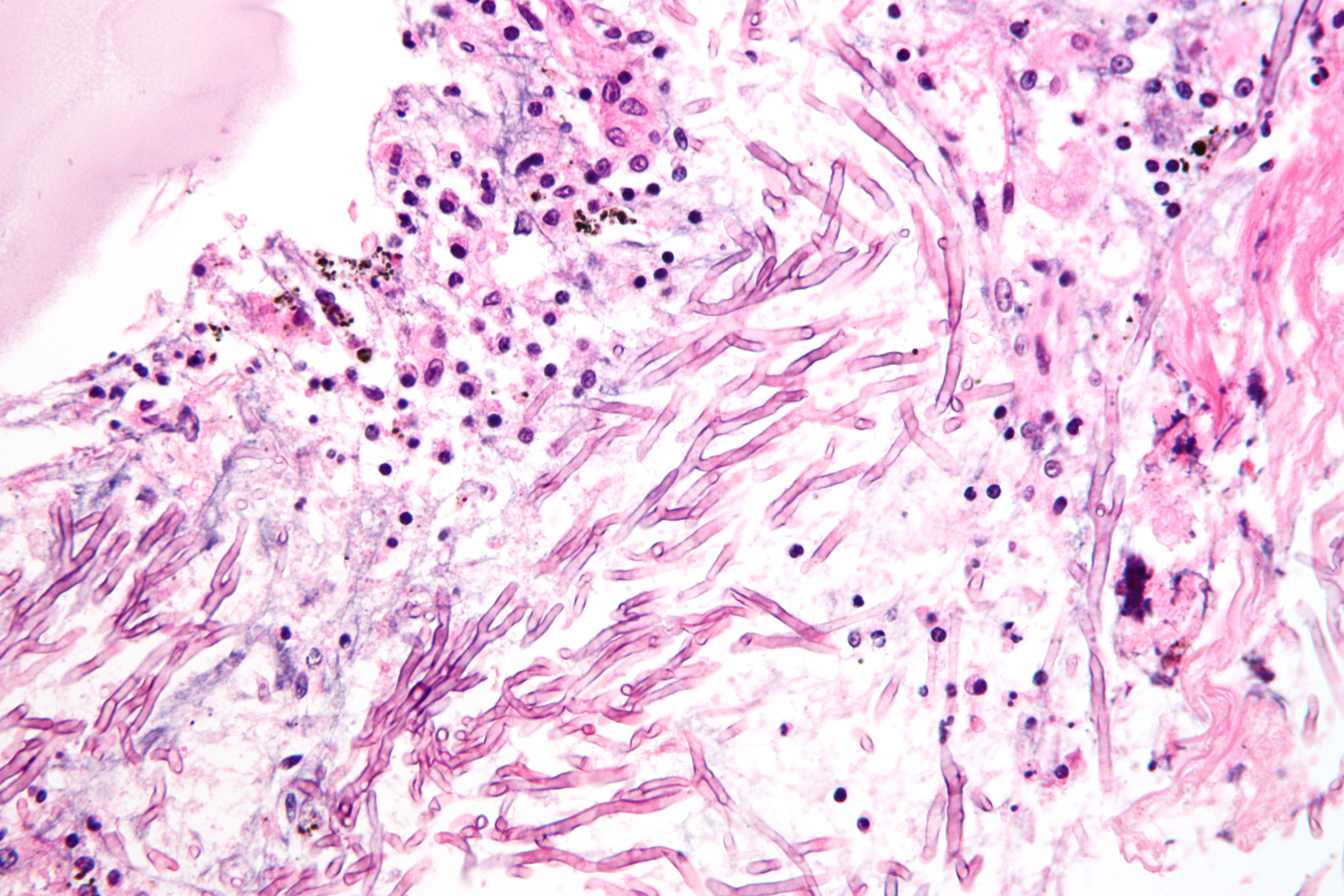
Gram stain of Aspergillus which can cause pulmonary aspergillosis, which L. jordanis can mimic

L. jordanis is an opportunistic pathogen. It has been shown to cause lower respiratory tract infections in humans and is responsible for causing a type of pneumonia commonly referred to as Legionnaires' disease. Lung infection with L. jordanis is sometimes misdiagnosed as an Aspergillus mold infection. This mold also causes a fatal type of pneumonia which L. jordanis is able to mimic. Using human sera, indirect fluorescent antibody tests strongly indicated that unrecognized human infections with L. jordanis may be occurring. A study of patients from Memorial Sloan-Kettering Cancer Center in New York, NY revealed a possible risk of nosocomial infections from shower heads found to contain L. jordanis. After this finding, monthly shower head disinfection procedures were instituted, but about 19% of shower heads remained positive for Legionella. Infections of individuals who are not immunocompromised are also possible.

== Metabolism and genomics ==
Newton, et al. cultured L. jordanis and various other species of Legionella in BCYE or ACES broth. DNA extraction and PCR amplification were done under standard conditions. However, due to low GC-content and the mismatching of base pairs, the temperature used during subtractive hybridization was adjusted to 35 °C. Small amounts of biosynthetic enzymes L-cysteine synthase and acetyltransferase were detected in L. jordanis and L. pneumophila; 19 open reading frames (ORFs) were found in L. jordanis, with a range of punitive functions making up around 47.5% of the 41 sequences represented by 40 ORFs. L. jordanis was found to contain the gene loci sidH, sidE, sidB, and sidG which express a Dot/Icm effector protein. This effector protein is essential for L. pneumophila to infiltrate host cells, so it is thought to be used as a virulence factor in L. jordanis, also. Both strains of L. jordanis tested positive for proteolysis and hemolysis. They did not test positive for cytotoxicity. Several species of Legionella “produced different proteolytic cleavage patterns on synthetic peptide substrates.” This suggests some genetic differences exist between the proteases produced by the different species of Legionella, despite them having some similarities. L. jordanis also appears to contain complex chains of lipopolysaccharides. Legionella species use amino acids as both carbon and energy sources.

== Ecology ==
The first two isolates of L. jordanis were from the waters of the Jordan River in Indiana. The strain was designated as BL-540. This area of the river was near an outbreak of Legionnaires' disease, which is caused by L. pneumonphila. Another isolate was found in sewage located in DeKalb County, Georgia. This strain was designated as ABB-9. Legionella species are aquatic organisms and typically inhabit freshwater environments with humans being accidental hosts. Most isolates of Legionella have been from air-conditioning cooling towers and potable-water distribution systems, but they can also be found in other thermally polluted water sources such as air conditioners, spa equipment, fountains, humidifiers, or showers. They can also be collected on the surfaces of lakes, mud, and streams. They can grow in temperatures ranging from 5 to 63 °C; optimal growth occurs between 25 and 40 °C.

== See also ==
- Bacterial pneumonia
