= C6H10N2O5 =

The molecular formula C_{6}H_{10}N_{2}O_{5} may refer to:

- ADA (buffer), a zwitterionic organic chemical buffering agent
- Carglumic acid, an orphan drug marketed by Orphan Europe under the trade name Carbaglu
