= TSE buffer =

Tris/Saline/EDTA buffer solution

TSE or Tris/Saline/EDTA, is a buffer solution containing a mixture of Tris base, Sodium chloride and EDTA.

In molecular biology, TSE buffers are often used in procedures involving nucleic acids. Tris-acid solutions are effective buffers for slightly basic conditions, which keep DNA deprotonated and soluble in water. The concentration of Tris (tris(hydroxymethyl)aminomethane) in the solution is kept near 25 mM. EDTA is a chelator of divalent cations, particularly of magnesium (Mg^{2+}). As these ions are necessary cofactors for many enzymes, including contaminant nucleases, EDTA protects nucleic acids against enzymatic degradation. But since Mg^{2+} is also a cofactor for many useful DNA-modifying enzymes such as restriction enzymes and DNA polymerases, its concentration in TSE buffers is generally kept low (typically at around 2.5 mM). Sodium chloride, used as a background electrolyte to maintain a constant ionic strength and osmotic pressure, is generally kept at a concentration of 50 mM.
