= MES (buffer) =

Names
- IUPAC names 2-morpholin-4-ylethanesulfonic acid Zwitterion: 2-morpholin-4-ium-4-ylethanesulfonate
- Other names 2-(N-morpholino)ethanesulfonic acid

Identifiers
CAS Number	4432-31-9 (free acid); 1266615-59-1 (hydrate); 145224-94-8 (monohydrate)
3D model (JSmol)	Interactive image
ChEBI	CHEBI:39005
ChemSpider	70541
ECHA InfoCard	100.022.394
PubChem CID	78165
UNII	2GNK67Q0C4
CompTox Dashboard (EPA)	DTXSID4063454
- InChI: InChI=1S/C6H13NO4S/c8-12(9,10)6-3-7-1-4-11-5-2-7/h1-6H2,(H,8,9,10) Key: SXGZJKUKBWWHRA-UHFFFAOYSA-N; InChI=1/C6H13NO4S/c8-12(9,10)6-3-7-1-4-11-5-2-7/h1-6H2,(H,8,9,10) Key: SXGZJKUKBWWHRA-UHFFFAOYAP
- SMILES: C1COCCN1CCS(=O)(=O)O

Properties
Chemical formula	C_{6}H_{13}NO_{4}S
Molar mass	195.2 g/mol
Acidity (pK_{a})	6.15
- Except where otherwise noted, data are given for materials in their standard state (at 25 °C [77 °F], 100 kPa). verify (what is ?) Infobox references

MES (2-(N-morpholino)ethanesulfonic acid) is a chemical compound that contains a morpholine ring. It has a molecular weight of 195.2 g/mol and the chemical formula is C_{6}H_{13}NO_{4}S. Synonyms include: 2-morpholinoethanesulfonic acid; 2-(4-morpholino)ethanesulfonic acid; 2-(N-morpholino)ethanesulfonic acid; 2-(4-morpholino)ethanesulfonic acid; MES; MES hydrate; and morpholine-4-ethanesulfonic acid hydrate. MOPS is a similar pH buffering compound which contains a propanesulfonic moiety instead of an ethanesulfonic one.

== Applications ==
MES is used as a buffering agent in biology and biochemistry. It has pK_{a} value of 6.15 at 20 °C. The pH (and pK_{a} at ionic strength I≠0) of the buffer solution changes with concentration and temperature, and this effect may be predicted using online calculators. MES is highly soluble in water. The melting point is approx. 300 °C.

MES was developed as one of Good's buffers in the 1960s. These buffers were developed with the following criteria in mind: midrange pK_{a}, maximum water solubility and minimum solubility in all other solvents, minimal salt effects, minimal change in pK_{a} with temperature, chemically and enzymatically stable, minimal absorption in visible or UV spectral range and reasonably easily synthesized. MES is also useful as a non-coordinating buffer in chemistry involving metal ions, as many common buffers (e.g. phosphate and acetate) readily form coordination complexes. MES only weakly binds Ca, Mg, Mn, and it has negligible binding with Cu(II).

== Effect of impurities ==
Commercial preparations of MES (and other sulfonylethyl buffers like BES, CHES, and PIPES) can contain a contaminant oligo(vinylsulfonic acid) (OVS), which is a polyanionic mimic of RNA, and can be a potent (pM) inhibitor of RNA binding proteins and enzymes.

== Safety ==
Contact with this buffer is hazardous; skin or eye exposure should be cleaned well with water and medical aid should be sought in the case of eye exposure, swallowing, or inhalation of dust. It also emits toxic fumes upon combustion, including carbon monoxide, nitrogen oxide, and sulfur oxides.

== See also ==
- CAPS (buffer)
- CHES (buffer)
- MOPS
- HEPES
- HEPPS (buffer)
- Tris
- Common buffer compounds used in biology
