= Robert Anthony Robinson =

New Zealand inorganic chemist

- Born: 1904
- Died: 1979 (aged 74–75)
- Known for: Britton–Robinson buffer

Robert Anthony Robinson OBE (1904–1979) was a New Zealand inorganic chemist, best known for his book Electrolyte solutions, which has been a standard for decades. In 1949 he won the Hector Medal from the Royal Society of New Zealand.

== Selected works ==
- Electrolyte solutions, the measurement and interpretation of conductance, chemical potential, and diffusion in solutions of simple electrolytes R A Robinson and R H Stokes, 1955. London: Butterworths Scientific Publications
- Electrolyte solutions, the measurement and interpretation of conductance, chemical potential, and diffusion in solutions of simple electrolytes R A Robinson and R H Stokes, 1970. Second edition London: Butterworths Scientific Publications ISBN 0486422259
- Electrolyte solutions, the measurement and interpretation of conductance, chemical potential, and diffusion in solutions of simple electrolytes R A Robinson and R H Stokes, 2002 Second edition ISBN 0486422259
