= PIPES =

- Chemical structure of PIPES

Names
- Preferred IUPAC name 2,2′-(Piperazine-1,4-diyl)di(ethane-1-sulfonic acid)
- Other names PIPES

Identifiers
CAS Number	5625-37-6
3D model (JSmol)	Interactive image
ChemSpider	72022
ECHA InfoCard	100.024.598
PubChem CID	6992709
UNII	G502H79V6L
CompTox Dashboard (EPA)	DTXSID8063965
- InChI: InChI=1S/C8H18N2O6S2/c11-17(12,13)7-5-9-1-2-10(4-3-9)6-8-18(14,15)16/h1-8H2,(H,11,12,13)(H,14,15,16) Key: IHPYMWDTONKSCO-UHFFFAOYSA-N; InChI=1/C8H18N2O6S2/c11-17(12,13)7-5-9-1-2-10(4-3-9)6-8-18(14,15)16/h1-8H2,(H,11,12,13)(H,14,15,16) Key: IHPYMWDTONKSCO-UHFFFAOYAG
- SMILES: C1CN(CCN1CCS(=O)(=O)O)CCS(=O)(=O)O

Properties
Chemical formula	C_{8}H_{18}N_{2}O_{6}S_{2}
Molar mass	302.37
Appearance	White powder
Melting point	Decomposes above 300 °C
Boiling point	Decomposes
Solubility in water	1 g/L (100 °C)

Hazards
- Occupational safety and health (OHS/OSH)
Main hazards	Irritant
NFPA 704 (fire diamond)	1 0 0
Safety data sheet (SDS)	External MSDS
- Except where otherwise noted, data are given for materials in their standard state (at 25 °C [77 °F], 100 kPa). verify (what is ?) Infobox references

PIPES (piperazine-N,N′-bis(2-ethanesulfonic acid)) is a frequently used buffering agent in biochemistry. It is an ethanesulfonic acid buffer developed by Good et al. in the 1960s.

== Applications ==
PIPES has two pKa values. One pKa (6.76 at 25 °C) is near the physiological pH which makes it useful in cell culture work. Its effective buffering range is 6.1-7.5 at 25 °C. The second pKa value is at 2.67 with a buffer range of from 1.5-3.5. PIPES has been documented minimizing lipid loss when buffering glutaraldehyde histology in plant and animal tissues. Fungal zoospore fixation for fluorescence microscopy and electron microscopy were optimized with a combination of glutaraldehyde and formaldehyde in PIPES buffer. It has a negligible capacity to bind divalent ions.

== See also ==
- MOPS
- HEPES
- MES
- Tris
- Common buffer compounds used in biology
- Good's buffers
