= Britton–Robinson buffer =

Universal pH buffer used for the pH range from 2 to 12

The Britton–Robinson buffer (BRB or PEM) is a "universal" pH buffer used for the pH range from 2 to 12. It has been used historically as an alternative to the McIlvaine buffer, which has a smaller pH range of effectiveness (from 2 to 8).

Universal buffers consist of mixtures of acids of diminishing strength (increasing pK_{a}), so that the change in pH is approximately proportional to the amount of alkali added. It consists of a mixture of 0.04 M boric acid, 0.04 M phosphoric acid and 0.04 M acetic acid that has been titrated to the desired pH with 0.2 M sodium hydroxide. Britton and Robinson also proposed a second formulation that gave an essentially linear pH response to added alkali from pH 2.5 to pH 9.2 (and buffers to pH 12). This mixture consists of 0.0286 M citric acid, 0.0286 M monopotassium phosphate, 0.0286 M boric acid, 0.0286 M veronal and 0.0286 M hydrochloric acid titrated with 0.2 M sodium hydroxide.

The buffer was invented in 1931 by the English chemist Hubert Thomas Stanley "Kevin" Britton (1892–1960) and the New Zealand chemist Robert Anthony Robinson (1904–1979).

== See also ==
- Buffer solution
- Good's buffers
