= C6H13NO4 =

The molecular formula C_{6}H_{13}NO_{4} (molar mass: 163.17 g/mol, exact mass: 163.0845 u) may refer to:

- Bicine
- 1-Deoxynojirimycin, or moranolin
- Perosamine
- Migalastat
