= Angiokinase inhibitors =

Angiokinase inhibitors are a new therapeutic target for the management of cancer. They inhibit tumour angiogenesis, one of the key processes leading to invasion and metastasis of solid tumours, by targeting receptor tyrosine kinases. Examples include nintedanib (BIBF 1120), afatinib (BIBW 2992) and motesanib (AMG 706).

== History ==
The term angiokinase was first documented by Auerswald et al. in a paper published in 1971. However, angiokinase inhibitors were not described until 2008 by Hilberg and colleagues. More recently, a number of phase I and II trials have been published, with further phase III trials currently in development.

== Drugs ==
=== BIBF 1120 (nintedanib) ===
BIBF 1120 is a triple angiokinase inhibitor developed by Boehringer Ingelheim which blocks the receptors for vascular endothelial growth factor (VEGF), platelet-derived growth factor (PDGF) and fibroblast growth factor (FGF).

In a phase I study of 25 patients with advanced solid tumours, BIBF 1120 showed a favourable safety and pharmacokinetic profile with a maximum tolerated dose of 250mg. Twice-daily dosing was not associated with increased toxicity.

In another phase I dose-escalation study, in 22 patients with advanced gynaecological malignancies, the maximum tolerated dose of BIBF 1120 twice-daily combined with paclitaxel and carboplatin was 200mg. The combination had an acceptable safety profile; the main side effects were gastrointestinal disorders and there were no clinically relevant drug–drug interactions.

In a phase II study, 73 patients with stage IIIB/IV cancer were randomly assigned to 250mg or 150mg BIBF 1120 monotherapy twice-daily. The median progression-free survival (PFS) was 1.6 months and the stable disease rate was 48%. Patients with an ECOG score of 0–1 (n=57) had a median PFS of 2.9 months and a stable disease rate of 59%. The median overall survival of all patients was 22 weeks (ECOG 0–2) and 38 weeks in patients with ECOG performance status 0 or 1. BIBF 1120 was well tolerated; the most frequent adverse events were grade 1 or 2 and included nausea, diarrhoea, vomiting, anorexia and fatigue.

A randomised phase II trial examined the use of continuous BIBF 1120 (250mg twice daily) for 9 months compared with placebo in 84 patients with relapsed ovarian cancer. After 36 weeks, PFS was 15.6% for BIBF 1120 and 2.9% for placebo. Median time to RECIST progression was 4.8 months for BIBF 1120 compared with 2.8 months for placebo. Grade 3/4 adverse events were observed in 7% and 3% of BIBF 1120 and placebo patients respectively. The authors conclude that BIBF 1120 could delay disease progression in patients with ovarian cancer who had previously responded to chemotherapy.

Phase III trials are currently underway to examine the safety and efficacy of BIBF 1120 in non-small-cell lung cancer (NSCLC) and advanced ovarian cancer.

=== BIBW 2992 (afatinib) ===
BIBW 2992 is a next-generation tyrosine kinase inhibitor developed by Boehringer Ingelheim which irreversibly blocks both epidermal growth factor receptor 1 (EGFR) and 2 (HER2) tyrosine kinase.

In the first human study of BIBW 2992, the maximum tolerated dose in a two-week-on, two-week off schedule was 70 mg once-daily. BIBW 2992 was well tolerated, with reversible adverse events including rash, diarrhoea, elevations in transaminases.

BIBW 2992 is a promising treatment for patients with NSCLC who have either primary (exon 20 insertion) or acquired (T790M) erlotinib resistance mutations. BIBW 2992 inhibits survival of cancer cell lines and induces tumour regression in xenograft and transgenic lung cancer models, with superior activity over erlotinib.

Several phase III studies investigating the safety and efficacy of BIBW 2992 in NSCLC and in breast cancer are currently recruiting patients.

=== AMG 706 (motesanib) ===
AMG 706 is a new, oral, small-molecule multikinase inhibitor developed by Amgen. It selectively targets vascular endothelial growth factor receptors 1, 2 and 3, platelet-derived growth factor receptor and Kit (stem-cell factor) receptors, which have been implicated in the pathogenesis of several human cancers. By blocking multiple signalling pathways, AMG 706 offers a new targeted approach for patients with metastatic disease.

In vitro studies have shown that AMG 706 inhibits human endothelial cell proliferation induced by VEGF, but not by basic fibroblast growth factor, as well as vascular permeability induced by VEGF in mice. Oral administration of AMG 706 potently inhibits VEGF-induced angiogenesis in a rat corneal model and induces regression of established A431 xenografts.

A number of phase I studies have established that AMG 706 is well tolerated in patients with advanced solid tumours and NSCLC.

A placebo-controlled phase III study, examining overall survival in patients with advanced NSCLC treated with AMG 706 in combination with paclitaxel and carboplatin, is currently ongoing.
