= Tricine =

- Skeletal formula of tricine

Names
- IUPAC name N-[1,3-Dihydroxy-2-(hydroxymethyl)propan-2-yl]glycine
- Systematic IUPAC name {[1,3-Dihydroxy-2-(hydroxymethyl)propan-2-yl]amino}acetic acid
- Other names Tricine; N-(Tri(hydroxymethyl)methyl)glycine

Identifiers
CAS Number	5704-04-1
3D model (JSmol)	Interactive image
Beilstein Reference	1937804
ChEBI	CHEBI:39063
ChemSpider	72078
ECHA InfoCard	100.024.721
EC Number	227-193-6
Gmelin Reference	3688
MeSH	tricine
PubChem CID	79784
UNII	W12LH4V8V3
CompTox Dashboard (EPA)	DTXSID1063982
- InChI: InChI=1S/C6H13NO5/c8-2-6(3-9,4-10)7-1-5(11)12/h7-10H,1-4H2,(H,11,12) Key: SEQKRHFRPICQDD-UHFFFAOYSA-N
- SMILES: O=C(O)CNC(CO)(CO)CO

Properties
Chemical formula	C_{6}H_{13}NO_{5}
Molar mass	179.172 g·mol^{−1}
Appearance	White crystals
Solubility in water	89.6 g L^{−1} (at 20 °C)
UV-vis (λ_{max})	260 nm
Absorbance	0.03

Related compounds
Related compounds	Milacemide
- Except where otherwise noted, data are given for materials in their standard state (at 25 °C [77 °F], 100 kPa). verify (what is ?) Infobox references

Tricine is an organic compound that is used in buffer solutions. The name tricine comes from tris and glycine, from which it was derived. It is a white crystalline powder that is moderately soluble in water. It is a zwitterionic amino acid that has a pKa1 value of 2.3 at 25 °C, while its pKa2 at 20 °C is 8.15. Its useful buffering range of pH is 7.4-8.8. Along with bicine, it is one of Good's buffering agents. Good first prepared tricine to buffer chloroplast reactions.

== Applications ==
Tricine is a commonly used electrophoresis buffer and is also used in resuspension of cell pellets. It has a higher negative (more negative) charge than glycine allowing it to migrate faster. In addition its high ionic strength causes more ion movement and less protein movement. This allows for low molecular weight proteins to be separated in lower percent acrylamide gels. Tricine has been documented in the separation of proteins in the range of 1 to 100 kDa by electrophoresis. The tricine buffer at 25 mmol/L was found to be the most effective buffer among the ten tested for ATP assays using firefly luciferase. Tricine has also been found to be an effective scavenger of hydroxyl radicals in a study of radiation-induced membrane damage.

== See also ==
- SDS-PAGE
- Ampholyte
- Glycine
- Bicine
