= MOPSO =

MOPSO may refer to:

- Multiple Objective Particle Swarm Optimization
- 2-Hydroxy-3-morpholinopropanesulfonic acid, a chemical buffering agent
