= Buffered charcoal yeast extract agar =

Selective culture medium

Buffered charcoal yeast extract (BCYE) agar is a selective growth medium used to culture or grow certain types of bacteria, particularly the Gram-negative species Legionella pneumophila. It has also been used for the laboratory diagnosis of Acanthamoeba keratitis, Francisella and Nocardia spp. It contains L-cysteine amino acid and ferric pyrophosphate that assist in the growth of Legionnaire's species. The charcoal within the medium acts as a detoxicant because it decomposes hydrogen peroxide which is toxic to the legionellae. The yeast extract in BCYE is the rich source of nutrients (vitamins, nitrogen, and carbon) that the bacteria depends on for growth. BCYE also has ACES (buffer) which maintains an optimal pH level for the bacteria to grow which is around 6.9. BCYE may be supplemented with antibiotics to select for legionellae, especially if screening an environmental or non-potable water specimen.

== Composition ==
Composition of BCYE agar medium
Ingredient	Amount (g/L)	Purpose
Agar	12.0	Solidifying, up to 17.0 g in some formulations
Yeast extract	10.0	Vitamins, nitrogen, and carbon
ACES buffer	10.0	Buffer
Activated charcoal	2.0	Decomposes hydrogen peroxide, a toxic metabolite of Legionella
Potassium hydroxide	2.8	pH (target shall be 6.9±0.2)
Alpha-ketoglutarate	1.0	Stimulates oxygen-scavenging enzymes in Legionella
L-cysteine	0.4	Provide essential nutrients to Legionella
Ferric pyrophosphate*	0.2	Provide essential nutrients to Legionella

* Ferric pyrophosphate (soluble) must be kept dry and in the dark.

== Preparation ==
From the CDC Laboratory Guidance for Legionella:

1. Add ACES buffer to 940 ml of distilled water and dissolved in a 50 °C water bath.
2. Slowly, add enough 1.0 N KOH (about 40 mL) to the buffer solution to bring the pH up to 6.9 and mix. (Do not use NaOH because it has been found to be inhibitory to Legionella pneumophila).
3. Into a second flask, add charcoal, yeast extract, alpha-keto-glutarate, and agar. Mix the dry powders.
4. Pour the buffer solution into the second flask containing the dry powders and mix.
5. Carefully heat to dissolve the agar, then sterilize by autoclaving at 121 °C for 15 minutes.
6. Immediately place the medium in 50 °C water bath.
7. For complete medium, slowly add membrane-filtered solution of L-cysteine to the medium and mix thoroughly. L-cysteine must be prepared as a fresh solution.
8. Slowly add membrane-filtered soluble ferric pyrophosphate, and mix thoroughly. Do not mix iron and cysteine before adding to medium as the L-cysteine is a chelating agent.
9. Adjust the pH of the medium to 6.9 at room temperature. Since reagents may vary, each laboratory must determine the amount of KOH required. Hold the completed medium at 50 °C, pour a 10 mL sample, and check the pH at room temperature. When necessary, adjust the completed medium with either 1.0 N KOH or 1.0 HCl. Note that the pKa of ACES buffer is 6.9 at 20 °C and 6.8 at 25 °C. Its pKa is affected by temperature (0.02 pH unit/o). However, once the agar has solidified, the pH does not appear to change with temperature but remains at 6.9.
10. For preparation of BCYE + antibiotics, add membrane-filtered antibiotics and mix.
11. For BCYE + albumin agar, dissolve the albumin in distilled water and filter sterilize before addition to the medium.
12. Dispense 20 mL per 15 X 100-mm Petri dish.

The medium must be mixed frequently during the pouring to keep the charcoal particles suspended. After the medium has solidified, the plates should be stored in plastic bags in the refrigerator in the dark. The prepared plates should be good for approximately 4 months, provided they pass quality control.

== Results ==
The Legionella bacteria that are smooth, colorless to blue or grey will become more white and filamentous over time and appear green and yellow fluorescent under UV light. The colony surface is typically smooth but may look like it has strains that give it a fried egg type of appearance when looked at under a microscope.

== Storage ==
BCYE plates should be stored in the dark at temperatures of 2–8 degree Celsius. Plates should not be frozen or overheated; keep exposure to light minimal. BCYE along with most growth mediums should not be opened unless it is being used and should be at room temperature before inoculating anything onto the medium.
