= Milacemide =

- Skeletal formula of milacemide

Names
- IUPAC name N^{2}-Pentylglycinamide
- Systematic IUPAC name 2-(Pentylamino)acetamide

Identifiers
CAS Number	76990-56-2
3D model (JSmol)	Interactive image
ChEMBL	ChEMBL75838
ChemSpider	48376
MeSH	milacemide
PubChem CID	53569
UNII	0HXT24RECU
CompTox Dashboard (EPA)	DTXSID10227786
- InChI: InChI=1S/C7H16N2O/c1-2-3-4-5-9-6-7(8)10/h9H,2-6H2,1H3,(H2,8,10) Key: GJNNXIYZWIZFRH-UHFFFAOYSA-N
- SMILES: CCCCCNCC(N)=O

Properties
Chemical formula	C_{7}H_{16}N_{2}O
Molar mass	144.218 g·mol^{−1}
log P	0.754

Related compounds
Related compounds	Tricine
- Except where otherwise noted, data are given for materials in their standard state (at 25 °C [77 °F], 100 kPa). Infobox references

Milacemide (INN) is an MAO-B inhibitor and glycine prodrug. It has been studied for its effects on human memory and as a potential treatment for the symptoms of Alzheimer's disease. Early clinical trials did not show positive results however, and the drug is now abandoned and it is sold as a nonprescription drug or supplement. While milacemide is not an amino-acid, it acts similarly to glycine in the brain.
