= HEPPS (buffer) =

- HEPPS

Names
- Preferred IUPAC name 3-[4-(2-Hydroxyethyl)piperazin-1-yl]propane-1-sulfonic acid
- Other names HEPPS, EPPS

Identifiers
CAS Number	16052-06-5
3D model (JSmol)	Interactive image
ChEBI	CHEBI:42298
ChemSpider	76886
ECHA InfoCard	100.036.528
PubChem CID	85255
UNII	8JN5PQW99C
CompTox Dashboard (EPA)	DTXSID3066003
- InChI: InChI=1S/C9H20N2O4S/c12-8-7-11-5-3-10(4-6-11)2-1-9-16(13,14)15/h12H,1-9H2,(H,13,14,15) Key: OWXMKDGYPWMGEB-UHFFFAOYSA-N; InChI=1/C9H20N2O4S/c12-8-7-11-5-3-10(4-6-11)2-1-9-16(13,14)15/h12H,1-9H2,(H,13,14,15) Key: OWXMKDGYPWMGEB-UHFFFAOYAP
- SMILES: O=S(=O)(O)CCCN1CCN(CCO)CC1

Properties
Chemical formula	C_{9}H_{20}N_{2}O_{4}S
Molar mass	252.33 g·mol^{−1}
Melting point	(decomposes)
- Except where otherwise noted, data are given for materials in their standard state (at 25 °C [77 °F], 100 kPa). verify (what is ?) Infobox references

HEPPS (EPPS) is a buffering agent used in biology and biochemistry. The pKa of HEPPS is 8.00. It is ones of Good's buffers.

Research on mice with Alzheimer's disease-like amyloid beta plaques has shown that HEPPS can cause the plaques to break up, reversing some of the symptoms in the mice. HEPPS was reported to dissociate amyloid beta oligomers in patients' plasma samples enabling blood diagnosis of Alzheimer's disease.

== See also ==
- CAPSO
- CHES
- HEPES
