= Cholamine chloride hydrochloride =

- Chemical structure of cholamine chloride hydrochloride

Names
- IUPAC name 2-aminoethyl(trimethyl)azanium;chloride;hydrochloride
- Other names Cholamine chloride hydrochloride, Trimethylammoniumchloridehydrochloride

Identifiers
CAS Number	3399-67-5
3D model (JSmol)	Interactive image
ChemSpider	11606383
ECHA InfoCard	100.020.243
EC Number	222-266-9
PubChem CID	16211104
CompTox Dashboard (EPA)	DTXSID30955574
- InChI: InChI=1S/C5H15N2.2ClH/c1-7(2,3)5-4-6;;/h4-6H2,1-3H3;2*1H/q+1;;/p-1 Key: GJBYCNLSIBQCRF-UHFFFAOYSA-M
- SMILES: C[N+](C)(C)CCN.Cl.[Cl-]

Properties
Chemical formula	C_{5}H_{16}Cl_{2}N_{2}
Molar mass	175.10 g·mol^{−1}

Hazards
- GHS labelling
Pictograms	(GHS07: Exclamation mark)
Signal word	Warning
Hazard statements	H315, H319, H335
Precautionary statements	P261, P264, P271, P280, P302+P352, P304+P340, P305+P351+P338, P312, P321, P332+P313, P337+P313, P362, P403+P233, P405, P501
- Except where otherwise noted, data are given for materials in their standard state (at 25 °C [77 °F], 100 kPa). Infobox references

Cholamine chloride hydrochloride is one of Good's buffers with a pH in the physiological range. Its pKa at 20°C is 7.10, making it useful in cell culture work. Its ΔpKa/°C is -0.027 and it has a solubility in water at 0°C of 4.2M.
