= Motesanib =

Names
- Preferred IUPAC name N-(3,3-Dimethyl-2,3-dihydro-1H-indol-6-yl)-2-{[(pyridin-4-yl)methyl]amino}pyridine-3-carboxamide
- Other names AMG 706

Identifiers
CAS Number	453562-69-1
3D model (JSmol)	Interactive image
ChEMBL	ChEMBL572881
ChemSpider	9842625
IUPHAR/BPS	5660
PubChem CID	11667893
UNII	U1JK633AYI
CompTox Dashboard (EPA)	DTXSID10196488
- InChI: InChI=1S/C22H23N5O/c1-22(2)14-26-19-12-16(5-6-18(19)22)27-21(28)17-4-3-9-24-20(17)25-13-15-7-10-23-11-8-15/h3-12,26H,13-14H2,1-2H3,(H,24,25)(H,27,28) Key: RAHBGWKEPAQNFF-UHFFFAOYSA-N
- SMILES: O=C(c2cccnc2NCc1ccncc1)Nc3ccc4c(c3)NCC4(C)C

Properties
Chemical formula	C_{22}H_{23}N_{5}O
Molar mass	373.460 g·mol^{−1}
- Except where otherwise noted, data are given for materials in their standard state (at 25 °C [77 °F], 100 kPa). Infobox references

Motesanib (AMG 706) is an experimental drug candidate originally developed by Amgen but later investigated by the Takeda Pharmaceutical Company. It is an orally administered small molecule belonging to angiokinase inhibitor class which acts as an antagonist of VEGF receptors, platelet-derived growth factor receptors, and stem cell factor receptors. It is used as the phosphate salt motesanib diphosphate. After clinical trials in thyroid cancer, non-small cell lung cancer, gastrointestinal stromal cancer, colorectal cancer, and breast cancer, the drug was not found to show sufficient efficacy for further development, and development was abandoned by Takeda.

== Clinical trials ==
Motesanib was originally investigated for effectiveness against advanced nonsquamous non-small-cell lung cancer (NSCLC), with Phase II trials indicating an effectiveness comparable to bevacizumab when they were both used in combination with paclitaxel/carboplatin. However a later and more detailed Phase III trial failed to show any benefit for the treatment of NSCLC. A second Phase III trial was started in 2012, which focused on patients from Asian backgrounds (performed on the basis of subgroup analysis) however this also failed to meet its primary endpoint.

The drug has undergone a Phase II evaluation as first-line therapy for breast cancer however this study found no evidence to support further investigation. Phase II testing against persistent or recurrent ovarian, fallopian tube and primary peritoneal carcinomas was also unsuccessful. Two phase II clinical trials for thyroid cancer showed promising results.
