= ADA (buffer) =

- Chemical structure of ADA

Names
- Systematic IUPAC name 2,2′-[(2-amino-2-oxoethyl)azanediyl]diacetic acid
- Other names ADA, N-(2-acetamido)iminodiacetic acid, N-(carbamoylmethyl)iminodiacetic acid

Identifiers
CAS Number	26239-55-4
3D model (JSmol)	Interactive image
ChEBI	CHEBI:43960
ChemSpider	105243
DrugBank	DB02810
ECHA InfoCard	100.043.194
EC Number	247-530-0
PubChem CID	117765
UNII	5C4R3O704E
CompTox Dashboard (EPA)	DTXSID4067191
- InChI: InChI=1S/C6H10N2O5/c7-4(9)1-8(2-5(10)11)3-6(12)13/h1-3H2,(H2,7,9)(H,10,11)(H,12,13) Key: QZTKDVCDBIDYMD-UHFFFAOYSA-N
- SMILES: C(C(=O)N)N(CC(=O)O)CC(=O)O

Properties
Chemical formula	C_{6}H_{10}N_{2}O_{5}
Molar mass	190.155 g/mol
Acidity (pK_{a})	6.6

Hazards
- Occupational safety and health (OHS/OSH)
Main hazards	Irritant
- GHS labelling
Signal word	Warning
Hazard statements	H302, H315, H319, H335
Precautionary statements	P261, P264, P270, P271, P280, P301+P312, P302+P352, P304+P340, P305+P351+P338, P312, P321, P330, P332+P313, P337+P313, P362, P403+P233, P405, P501
Flash point	Non-flammable
- Except where otherwise noted, data are given for materials in their standard state (at 25 °C [77 °F], 100 kPa). Infobox references

ADA is a zwitterionic organic chemical buffering agent; one of Good's buffers. It has a useful pH range of 6.0-7.2 in the physiological range, making it useful for cell culture work. It has a pKa of 6.6 with ΔpKa/°C of -0.011 and is most often prepared in 1 M NaOH where it has a solubility of 160 mg/mL.

ADA has been used in protein-free media for chicken embryo fibroblasts, as a chelating agent for H^{+}, Ca^{2+}, and Mg^{2+}, and for isoelectric focusing in immobilized pH gradients. Its effects on dog kidney Na^{+}/K^{+}-ATPase and rat brain GABA receptors have also been studied. ADA does, however, alter coloring in bicinchoninic acid assays.
