= Hubert Britton =

British chemist (1892–1960)

Hubert Britton FIC
- Born: Hubert Thomas Stanley Britton; 22 April 1892; Kingswood, Bristol
- Died: 30 December 1960 (aged 68); Three Bridges, West Sussex
- Education: St. George's Grammar School; University of Bristol; King's College London
- Known for: Britton–Robinson buffer
- Children: 1 son, 1 daughter
- Scientific career
- Fields: Chemistry
- Workplaces: King's College London; Imperial College London; Norwood Technical College; University of Exeter

Hubert Thomas Stanley Britton FIC (22 April 1892 – 30 December 1960) was a British chemist and professor of chemistry and director of the Washington Singer Laboratories, University of Exeter. He is known for his 1931 invention of the Britton–Robinson buffer.

== Early life and education ==
He was born in Kingswood, Bristol on 22 April 1892, the son of Thomas Ernest and Clara Britton. His father was a shoemaker. Britton was educated at St George Grammar School and the Merchant Venturers College, Bristol, before receiving a scholarship for the University of Bristol in 1911. He graduated from Bristol in 1914.

== Career ==
Britton worked briefly as a schoolmaster before becoming a chemist at the Air Ministry's Aeronautical Inspection Department, where he served during World War I and remained until 1920. In 1920, he became an assistant lecturer at King's College London, where he also later earned a DSc in 1926. He left King's for Imperial College London in 1925 to take up a senior award of the Department of Scientific and Industrial Research, though this position was terminated in 1927. Following this, he lectured for a year at Norwood Technical College.

In 1928, he was a lecturer in chemistry at the University College of the South West in Exeter and earned a second doctorate there in 1934. He succeeded William Henry Lewis as the college's head of the chemistry department following the latter's retirement in 1935, remaining in this post until his own retirement in 1957.

== Personal life and death ==
In 1957, he retired and moved to Three Bridges, Sussex, where his wife died in June 1959, and where he died on 30 December 1960. They had a son and a daughter.

His son, Hubert Greenslade Britton, earned a degree in chemistry from Exeter, qualified in medicine, and completed a PhD in chemistry.

== Publications ==
- Britton, Hubert T. S. (1929). Tripp, E. Howard (ed.). Hydrogen Ions: Their Determination and Importance in Pure and Industrial Chemistry. Monographs on Applied Chemistry. London: Chapman and Hall Ltd. (3 volumes)
- ————————— (1932). Chemistry, Life, and Civilisation: A Popular Account of Modern Advances in Chemistry. London: Chapman and Hall Ltd.
