= TES (buffer) =

Names
- Preferred IUPAC name 2-{[1,3-Dihydroxy-2-(hydroxymethyl)propan-2-yl]amino}ethane-1-sulfonic acid
- Other names TES free acid

Identifiers
CAS Number	7365-44-8; 70331-82-7 (sodium salt)
3D model (JSmol)	Interactive image
ChemSpider	73842
ECHA InfoCard	100.028.097
PubChem CID	6992013
UNII	L173DK6289
CompTox Dashboard (EPA)	DTXSID3064643
- InChI: InChI=1S/C6H15NO6S/c8-3-6(4-9,5-10)7-1-2-14(11,12)13/h7-10H,1-5H2,(H,11,12,13) Key: JOCBASBOOFNAJA-UHFFFAOYSA-N; InChI=1/C6H15NO6S/c8-3-6(4-9,5-10)7-1-2-14(11,12)13/h7-10H,1-5H2,(H,11,12,13) Key: JOCBASBOOFNAJA-UHFFFAOYAR
- SMILES: C(CS(=O)(=O)O)NC(CO)(CO)CO

Properties
Chemical formula	C_{6}H_{15}NO_{6}S
Molar mass	229.25 g/mol
- Except where otherwise noted, data are given for materials in their standard state (at 25 °C [77 °F], 100 kPa). verify (what is ?) Infobox references

TES is used to make buffer solutions. It has a pK_{a} value of 7.550 (I=0, 25°C). It is one of the Good's buffers and can be used to make buffer solutions in the pH range 6.8–8.2. It is one of the components of Test yolk buffer medium used for refrigeration and transport of semen.
