= Good's buffers =

Buffering agents for biochemical and biological research

Good's buffers (also Good buffers) are twenty buffering agents for biochemical and biological research selected and described by Norman Good and colleagues during 1966–1980. Most of the buffers were new zwitterionic compounds prepared and tested by Good and coworkers for the first time, though some (MES, ADA, BES, Bicine) were known compounds previously overlooked by biologists. Before Good's work, few hydrogen ion buffers between pH 6 and 8 had been accessible to biologists, and very inappropriate, toxic, reactive and inefficient buffers had often been used. Many Good's buffers became and remain crucial tools in modern biological laboratories.

== Selection criteria ==
Good sought to identify buffering compounds which met several criteria likely to be of value in biological research.

1. pK_{a}: Because most biological reactions take place near-neutral pH between 6 and 8, ideal buffers would have pK_{a} values in this region to provide maximum buffering capacity there.
2. Solubility: For ease in handling and because biological systems are in aqueous systems, good solubility in water was required. Low solubility in nonpolar solvents (fats, oils, and organic solvents) was also considered beneficial, as this would tend to prevent the buffer compound from accumulating in nonpolar compartments in biological systems: cell membranes and other cell compartments.
3. Membrane impermeability: Ideally, a buffer will not readily pass through cell membranes, this will also reduce the accumulation of buffer compound within cells.
4. Minimal salt effects: Highly ionic buffers may cause problems or complications in some biological systems.
5. Influences on dissociation: There should be a minimum influence of buffer concentration, temperature, and ionic composition of the medium on the dissociation of the buffer.
6. Well-behaved cation interactions: If the buffers form complexes with cationic ligands, the complexes formed should remain soluble. Ideally, at least some of the buffering compounds will not form complexes.
7. Stability: The buffers should be chemically stable, resisting enzymatic and non-enzymatic degradation.
8. Biochemical inertness: The buffers should not influence or participate in any biochemical reactions.
9. Optical absorbance: Buffers should not absorb visible or ultraviolet light at wavelengths longer than 230 nm so as not to interfere with commonly used spectrophotometric assays.
10. Ease of preparation: Buffers should be easily prepared and purified from inexpensive materials.

== List of Good's buffers ==
The following table presents pK_{a} values at 20 °C. Values change by about 0.01 per degree of temperature. Good's original 1966 paper had two older buffers (marked with italics) for comparison. In 1972 Good published a second list with three more buffers, and five more were added in 1980.

Buffer	pK_{a}	Useful pH Range	Date added
MES	6.15	5.5–6.7	1966
ADA	6.62	6.0–7.2	1966
PIPES	6.82	6.1–7.5	1966
ACES	6.88	6.1–7.5	1966
MOPSO	6.95	6.2–7.6	1980
Cholamine chloride	7.10		1966
MOPS	7.15	6.5–7.9	1972
BES	7.17	6.4–7.8	1966
TES	7.50	6.8–8.2	1966
HEPES	7.55	6.8–8.2	1966
DIPSO	7.60	7.0–8.2	1980
TAPSO	7.60	7.0–8.2	1980
Acetamidoglycine [fr]	7.70		1966
POPSO [fr]	7.85		1980
HEPPSO [fr]	7.90		1980
HEPPS	8.10	7.6–8.6	1972
Tricine	8.15	7.4–8.8	1966
Glycinamide	8.20		1966
Glycylglycine	8.20	7.5–8.9	1966
Bicine	8.35	7.6–9.0	1966
TAPS	8.55	7.7–9.1	1972

All buffering agents achieve their function because they contain an acidic group (acetate, phosphate, sulphonate ..) or a basic group (amino, pyridyl ..). A consequence of this is that they can form complexes with the biologically important ions Na^{+}, K^{+}, Mg^{2+} and Ca^{2+} and can compete for the metal ion contained in a metalloprotein. In fact, Good stated that "it may be that the quest for universal biological inertness is futile."

Piperazine-containing buffers (PIPES, HEPES, POPSO and EPPS) can form radicals and should be avoided in studies of redox processes in biochemistry.

Tricine is photo-oxidised by flavins, and therefore reduces the activity of flavone enzymes at daylight. Free acids of ADA, POPSO and PIPES are poorly soluble in water, but they are very soluble as monosodium salts. ADA absorbs UV light below 260 nm, and ACES absorbs it at 230 nm and below.

Over the years, pK_{a}s and other thermodynamic values of many Good's buffers have been thoroughly investigated and re-evaluated. In general, Norman Good and his co-workers attracted attention of the scientific community to the possibility and benefits of using zwitterionic buffers in biological research. Since then, other zwitterionic compounds, including AMPSO, CABS, CHES, CAPS and CAPSO, were investigated for use in a biological context.

== See also ==
- Buffer solution
- Britton–Robinson buffer
