= TAPSO =

Names
- IUPAC name 3-[[1,3-dihydroxy-2-(hydroxymethyl)propan-2-yl]amino]-2-hydroxypropane-1-sulfonic acid
- Other names 3-[N-Tris(hydroxymethyl)methylamino]-2-hydroxypropanesulfonic acid

Identifiers
CAS Number	68399-81-5
3D model (JSmol)	Interactive image
ChemSpider	98301
ECHA InfoCard	100.063.611
PubChem CID	109334
UNII	45Q4J0071U
CompTox Dashboard (EPA)	DTXSID80887356
- InChI: InChI=1S/C7H17NO7S/c9-3-7(4-10,5-11)8-1-6(12)2-16(13,14)15/h6,8-12H,1-5H2,(H,13,14,15) Key: RZQXOGQSPBYUKH-UHFFFAOYSA-N; InChI=1/C7H17NO7S/c9-3-7(4-10,5-11)8-1-6(12)2-16(13,14)15/h6,8-12H,1-5H2,(H,13,14,15) Key: RZQXOGQSPBYUKH-UHFFFAOYAF
- SMILES: O=S(=O)(O)CC(O)CNC(CO)(CO)CO

Properties
Chemical formula	C_{7}H_{17}NO_{7}S
Molar mass	259.28 g/mol
- Except where otherwise noted, data are given for materials in their standard state (at 25 °C [77 °F], 100 kPa). verify (what is ?) Infobox references

TAPSO is used to make buffer solutions. It has a pK_{a} value of 7.635 (I=0, 25°C). It can be used to make buffer solutions in the pH range 7.0-8.2.
