= Robin Stokes =

Australian chemist

Robert Harold (Robin) Stokes FAA (1918–2016) was an Australian chemist and Foundation Professor of Chemistry at the University of New England, from 1955 to 1979. His research interests included solution thermodynamics and electrolytes.

Stokes was born on 24 December 1918 at Southsea in England, and the family moved to New Zealand in the 1920s. Stokes was educated at Auckland Grammar School and Auckland University College, where his studies were interrupted by the war, (BSc 1938, MSc (hons) 1940, DSc 1949) and University of Cambridge (PhD 1950).

In 1942 he married Jean Wilson and in 1946 he accepted a position at the University of Western Australia.

He is a relation of the Anglo-Irish Stokes family including Sir George Stokes and John Stokes.

== Honours, awards and prizes ==
- 1957 Fellow of the Australian Academy of Science (F.A.A.)
- Fellow of the Royal Society of Chemistry (F.R.S.C.)
- Fellow of the Royal Australian Chemical Institute (F.R.A.C.I.)
- 1940, Sir George Fowlds Medal, Auckland University College
- 1946, Rennie Medal, Australian Chemical Institute
- 1946, Meldola Medal, Institute of Chemistry
- 1953, H.G. Smith Medal, Australian Chemical Institute
- 1977, Queen's Jubilee Medal
- 1980, R.H. Stokes Medal, Electrochemistry Division, Royal Australian Chemical Institute (Inaugural award)
- 1981, R.A. Robinson Memorial Medal, Faraday Division, Royal Society of Chemistry (Inaugural award)
- 2001, Centenary Medal
