= ACES (buffer) =

Names
- Preferred IUPAC name 2-[(2-Amino-2-oxoethyl)amino]ethane-1-sulfonic acid
- Other names N-(2-Acetamido)-2-aminoethanesulfonic acid

Identifiers
CAS Number	7365-82-4
3D model (JSmol)	Interactive image; Interactive image
ChEBI	CHEBI:39062
ChemSpider	73843
ECHA InfoCard	100.028.099
PubChem CID	81832
UNII	I5SPL5YVBY
CompTox Dashboard (EPA)	DTXSID8064644
- InChI: InChI=1S/C4H10N2O4S/c5-4(7)3-6-1-2-11(8,9)10/h6H,1-3H2,(H2,5,7)(H,8,9,10) Key: DBXNUXBLKRLWFA-UHFFFAOYSA-N; InChI=1/C4H10N2O4S/c5-4(7)3-6-1-2-11(8,9)10/h6H,1-3H2,(H2,5,7)(H,8,9,10) Key: DBXNUXBLKRLWFA-UHFFFAOYAH
- SMILES: C(CS(=O)(=O)O)NCC(=O)N; O=S(=O)(O)CCNCC(=O)N

Properties
Chemical formula	C_{4}H_{10}N_{2}O_{4}S
Molar mass	182.199
- Except where otherwise noted, data are given for materials in their standard state (at 25 °C [77 °F], 100 kPa). verify (what is ?) Infobox references

ACES (N-(2-acetamido)-2-aminoethanesulfonic acid) is a chemical compound that is one of Good's buffers. It was developed in the 1960s to provide buffer solutions with pH ranging from 6.15-8.35 for use in various applications. With a pK_{a} of 6.9, it is often used as a buffering agent in biological and biochemical research. It is a zwitterionic buffer with a useful buffering range of 6.1-7.5. The pioneering publication by Good and his co-workers described the synthesis and physical properties of ACES buffer.

== Applications ==
ACES had been used to develop buffers for both agarose and polyacrylamide gel electrophoresis. ACES use in isoelectric focusing of proteins has also been documented. Use of ACES has been published in a protocol for the analysis of bacterial autolysins in a discontinuous SDS-PAGE system. Potential inhibition of ACES and other Good buffers has been investigated in γ-aminobutyric acid receptor binding to rat brain synaptic membranes.
