= MOPS =

Names
- Preferred IUPAC name 3-(Morpholin-4-yl)propane-1-sulfonic acid
- Other names 3-(N-Morpholino)propanesulfonic acid, 3-Morpholinopropanesulfonic acid, 3-N-Morpholino propansulfonic acid, 4-Morpholinepropanesulfonic acid

Identifiers
CAS Number	1132-61-2 (free acid); 71119-22-7 (sodium salt)
3D model (JSmol)	Interactive image
ChemSpider	63972
ECHA InfoCard	100.013.162
PubChem CID	70807; 2723950
UNII	273BP63NV3
CompTox Dashboard (EPA)	DTXSID4044371
- InChI: InChI=1S/C7H15NO4S/c9-13(10,11)7-1-2-8-3-5-12-6-4-8/h1-7H2,(H,9,10,11) Key: DVLFYONBTKHTER-UHFFFAOYSA-N; InChI=1/C7H15NO4S/c9-13(10,11)7-1-2-8-3-5-12-6-4-8/h1-7H2,(H,9,10,11) Key: DVLFYONBTKHTER-UHFFFAOYAN
- SMILES: C1COCCN1CCCS(=O)(=O)O

Properties
Chemical formula	C_{7}H_{15}NO_{4}S
Molar mass	209.26 g·mol^{−1}

Hazards
- GHS labelling
Pictograms	(GHS07: Exclamation mark)
Signal word	Warning
Hazard statements	H315, H319, H335
Precautionary statements	P261, P264, P271, P280, P302+P352, P304+P340, P305+P351+P338, P312, P321, P332+P313, P337+P313, P362, P403+P233, P405, P501
- Except where otherwise noted, data are given for materials in their standard state (at 25 °C [77 °F], 100 kPa). verify (what is ?) Infobox references

MOPS (3-(N-morpholino)propanesulfonic acid) is a buffer introduced in the 1960s, one of the twenty Good's buffers. It is a structural analog to MES, and like MES, its structure contains a morpholine ring. HEPES is a similar pH buffering compound that contains a piperazine ring. With a pK_{a} of 7.20, MOPS is an excellent buffer for many biological systems at near-neutral pH.

== Applications ==
MOPS is frequently used as a buffering agent in biology and biochemistry. It has been tested and recommended for polyacrylamide gel electrophoresis. Usage above 20 mM in mammalian cell culture work is not recommended. MOPS buffer solutions become discolored (yellow) over time, but reportedly slight discoloration does not significantly affect the buffering characteristics.

== See also ==
- CAPS
- HEPPS
- Tris
- Common buffer compounds used in biology
