= TAPS (buffer) =

Names
- Preferred IUPAC name 3-{[1,3-Dihydroxy-2-(hydroxymethyl)propan-2-yl]amino}propane-1-sulfonic acid
- Other names N-Tris(hydroxymethyl)methyl-3-aminopropanesulfonic acid

Identifiers
CAS Number	29915-38-6
3D model (JSmol)	Interactive image
ChemSpider	108495
ECHA InfoCard	100.045.398
PubChem CID	121591
UNII	Y5DC3IN066
CompTox Dashboard (EPA)	DTXSID3067528
- InChI: InChI=1S/C7H17NO6S/c9-4-7(5-10,6-11)8-2-1-3-15(12,13)14/h8-11H,1-6H2,(H,12,13,14) Key: YNLCVAQJIKOXER-UHFFFAOYSA-N; InChI=1/C7H17NO6S/c9-4-7(5-10,6-11)8-2-1-3-15(12,13)14/h8-11H,1-6H2,(H,12,13,14) Key: YNLCVAQJIKOXER-UHFFFAOYAP
- SMILES: C(CNC(CO)(CO)CO)CS(=O)(=O)O

Properties
Chemical formula	C_{7}H_{17}NO_{6}S
Molar mass	243.27 g·mol^{−1}
- Except where otherwise noted, data are given for materials in their standard state (at 25 °C [77 °F], 100 kPa). verify (what is ?) Infobox references

TAPS ([tris(hydroxymethyl)methylamino]propanesulfonic acid) is a chemical compound commonly used to make buffer solutions.

It can bind divalent cations, including Co(II) and Ni(II).

TAPS is effective to make buffer solutions in the pH range 7.7–9.1, since it has a pK_{a} value of 8.44 (ionic strength I = 0, 25 °C).

The pH (and pK_{a} at I ≠ 0) of the buffer solution changes with concentration and temperature, and this effect may be predicted e.g. using online calculators.
