= Iron(III) pyrophosphate =

Names
- Other names Ferric pyrophosphate

Identifiers
CAS Number	10058-44-3 (anhydrous); 10049-18-0 (nonahydrate); 1802359-96-1
3D model (JSmol)	Interactive image
ChEBI	CHEBI:132767
ChemSpider	23258; 34994433
DrugBank	DB09147; DB13995
ECHA InfoCard	100.030.160
EC Number	233-190-0
PubChem CID	24877
UNII	QK8899250F; 1ZJR117WBQ (nonahydrate); UBY79OCO9G
CompTox Dashboard (EPA)	DTXSID6047600
- InChI: Key: CADNYOZXMIKYPR-UHFFFAOYSA-B; InChI=1S/4Fe.3H4O7P2/c;;;;3*1-8(2,3)7-9(4,5)6/h;;;;3*(H2,1,2,3)(H2,4,5,6)/q4*+3;;;/p-12
- SMILES: [Fe+3].O=P([O-])([O-])OP(=O)([O-])[O-].[Fe+3].O=P([O-])([O-])OP(=O)([O-])[O-].[Fe+3].O=P([O-])([O-])OP(=O)([O-])[O-].[Fe+3]

Properties
Chemical formula	Fe_{4}(P_{2}O_{7})_{3}
Molar mass	745.224 (anhydrate); 907.348 (nonahydrate)
Appearance	yellow solid (nonahydrate)
Solubility in water	insoluble

Pharmacology
Legal status	CA: ℞-only; US: ℞-only
- Except where otherwise noted, data are given for materials in their standard state (at 25 °C [77 °F], 100 kPa). Infobox references

Iron(III) pyrophosphate is an inorganic chemical compound with the formula Fe_{4}(P_{2}O_{7})_{3}.

== Synthesis ==
Anhydrous iron(III) pyrophosphate can be prepared by heating the mixture of iron(III) metaphosphate and iron(III) phosphate under oxygen with the stoichiometric ratio 1:3. The reactants can be prepared by reacting iron(III) nitrate nonahydrate with phosphoric acid.

It can be also precipitated by mixing solutions of tetrasodium pyrophosphate and ferric chloride:

3 Na_{4}P_{2}O_{7} + 4 FeCl_{3} → Fe_{4}(P_{2}O_{7})_{3} + 12 NaCl
