= Heptaprenyl diphosphate synthase =

Class of enzymes

heptaprenyl diphosphate synthase

Identifiers
- EC no.: 2.5.1.30
- CAS no.: 74506-59-5

Databases
- IntEnz: IntEnz view
- BRENDA: BRENDA entry
- ExPASy: NiceZyme view
- KEGG: KEGG entry
- MetaCyc: metabolic pathway
- PRIAM: profile
- PDB structures: RCSB PDB PDBe PDBsum
- Gene Ontology: AmiGO / QuickGO
Search
- PMC: articles
- PubMed: articles
- NCBI: proteins

In enzymology, a heptaprenyl diphosphate synthase (EC 2.5.1.30) is an enzyme that catalyzes the chemical reaction

(2E,6E)-farnesyl diphosphate + 4 isopentenyl diphosphate $\rightleftharpoons$ 4 diphosphate + all-trans-heptaprenyl diphosphate

Thus, the two substrates of this enzyme are (2E,6E)-farnesyl diphosphate and isopentenyl diphosphate, whereas its two products are diphosphate and all-trans-heptaprenyl diphosphate.

This enzyme belongs to the family of transferases, specifically those transferring aryl or alkyl groups other than methyl groups. The systematic name of this enzyme class is (2E,6E)-farnesyl-diphosphate:isopentenyl-diphosphate farnesyltranstransferase (adding 4 isopentenyl units). Other names in common use include all-trans-heptaprenyl-diphosphate synthase, heptaprenyl pyrophosphate synthase, and heptaprenyl pyrophosphate synthetase. This enzyme participates in biosynthesis of steroids.

== Structural studies ==
As of late 2007, 11 structures have been solved for this class of enzymes, with PDB accession codes 2E8T, 2E8U, 2E8V, 2E8W, 2E8X, 2E90, 2E91, 2E92, 2E93, 2E94, and 2E95.
