= HEPES =

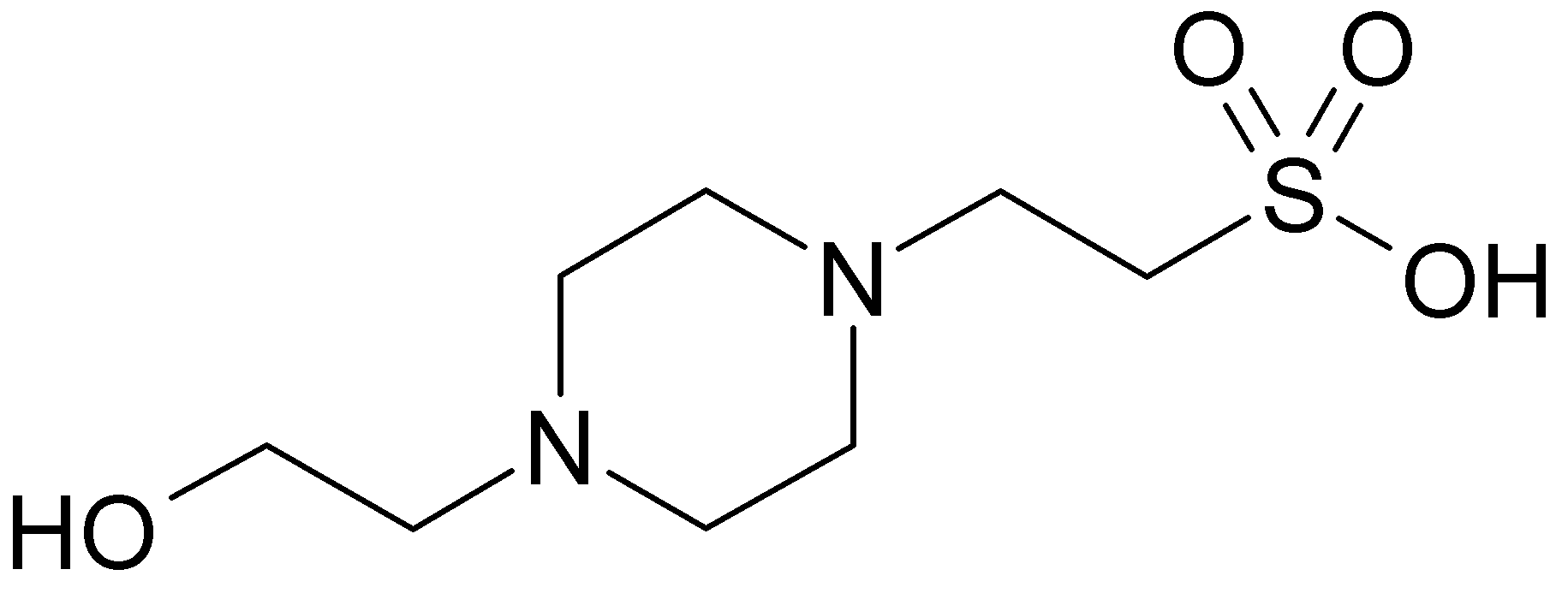
- chemical structure of HEPES

Names
- Preferred IUPAC name 2-[4-(2-Hydroxyethyl)piperazin-1-yl]ethane-1-sulfonic acid
- Other names HEPES

Identifiers
CAS Number	7365-45-9 (free acid); 75277-39-3 (sodium salt)
3D model (JSmol)	Interactive image
Beilstein Reference	883043
ChEBI	CHEBI:42334
ChemSpider	22278
ECHA InfoCard	100.028.098
EC Number	230-907-9
PubChem CID	23831
RTECS number	TL6809000
UNII	RWW266YE9I
CompTox Dashboard (EPA)	DTXSID5040382
- InChI: InChI=1S/C8H18N2O4S/c11-7-5-9-1-3-10(4-2-9)6-8-15(12,13)14/h11H,1-8H2,(H,12,13,14) Key: JKMHFZQWWAIEOD-UHFFFAOYSA-N; InChI=1/C8H18N2O4S/c11-7-5-9-1-3-10(4-2-9)6-8-15(12,13)14/h11H,1-8H2,(H,12,13,14) Key: JKMHFZQWWAIEOD-UHFFFAOYAC
- SMILES: OCCN1CC[NH+](CCS(=O)([O-])=O)CC1

Properties
Chemical formula	C_{8}H_{18}N_{2}O_{4}S
Molar mass	238.3012 g/mol
Appearance	white crystalline powder
Density	Not applicable
Melting point	>234-238°C (453-457K)
Solubility in water	40 g/100 ml (20°C)
Acidity (pK_{a})	3 (pK_{a1}), 7.5 (pK_{a2})

Hazards
- Occupational safety and health (OHS/OSH)
Main hazards	Eye Irritant
- GHS labelling
Pictograms	(GHS07: Exclamation mark)
Signal word	Warning
Hazard statements	H315, H319, H335
Precautionary statements	P261, P264, P270, P271, P280, P301+P312, P302+P352, P304+P312, P304+P340, P305+P351+P338, P312, P321, P322, P330, P332+P313, P337+P313, P362, P363, P403+P233, P405, P501
NFPA 704 (fire diamond)	1 0 1
Flash point	Non-flammable
- Safety data sheet (SDS)
- Except where otherwise noted, data are given for materials in their standard state (at 25 °C [77 °F], 100 kPa). verify (what is ?) Infobox references

HEPES (4-(2-hydroxyethyl)-1-piperazineethanesulfonic acid) is a zwitterionic sulfonic acid buffering agent. It is one of the twenty Good's buffers. HEPES is widely used in cell culture, largely because it is better at maintaining physiological pH despite changes in carbon dioxide concentration (produced by aerobic respiration) when compared to bicarbonate buffers, which are also commonly used in cell culture. Lepe-Zuniga et al. reported an unwanted photochemical process wherein HEPES catalyzes a reaction with riboflavin when exposed to ambient light to produce hydrogen peroxide. This is not a problem in bicarbonate-based cell culture buffers. It is therefore strongly advised to keep solutions containing both HEPES and riboflavin in darkness as much as possible to prevent oxidation.

HEPES has the following characteristics:

- pK_{a1} (25 °C) = 3
- pK_{a2} (25 °C) = 7.5
- Useful pH range = 2.5 to 3.5 or 6.8 to 8.2

HEPES has negligible metal ion binding, making it a good choice as a buffer for enzymes which might be inhibited by metal chelation.

== See also ==
- CAPS
- CHES
- MOPS
- HEPPS
- MES
- HEPBS
- PIPES
- Common buffer compounds used in biology
