= Bicine =

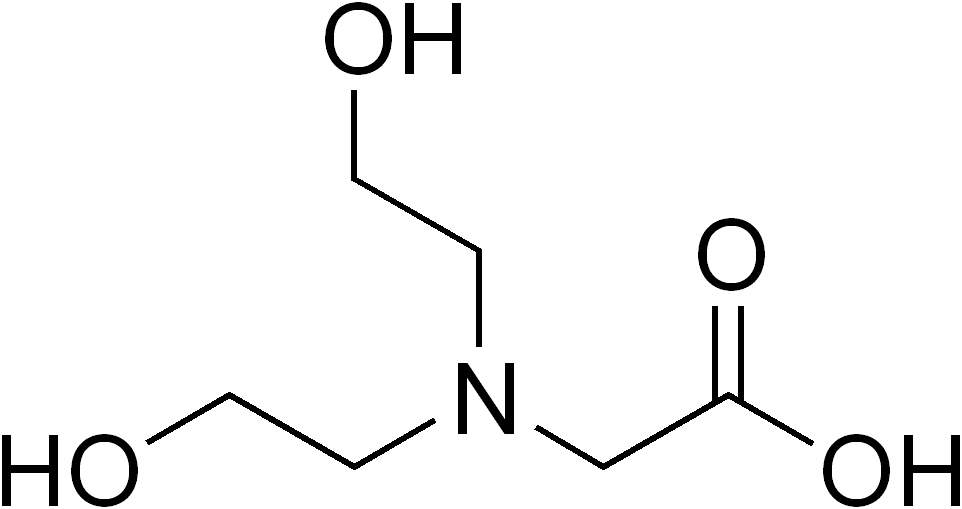

Names
- IUPAC name N,N-Bis(2-hydroxyethyl)glycine
- Systematic IUPAC name [Bis(2-hydroxyethyl)amino]acetic acid
- Other names Diethylolglycine; Diethanol glycine; Dihydroxyethylglycine; BHG

Identifiers
CAS Number	150-25-4
3D model (JSmol)	Interactive image
Abbreviations	DHEG
ChEBI	CHEBI:39066
ChEMBL	ChEMBL1231251
ChemSpider	8431
DrugBank	DB03709
ECHA InfoCard	100.005.233
PubChem CID	8761
UNII	1J484QFI1O
CompTox Dashboard (EPA)	DTXSID3041669
- InChI: InChI=1S/C6H13NO4/c8-3-1-7(2-4-9)5-6(10)11/h8-9H,1-5H2,(H,10,11) Key: FSVCELGFZIQNCK-UHFFFAOYSA-N; InChI=1/C6H13NO4/c8-3-1-7(2-4-9)5-6(10)11/h8-9H,1-5H2,(H,10,11) Key: FSVCELGFZIQNCK-UHFFFAOYAV
- SMILES: O=C(O)CN(CCO)CCO

Properties
Chemical formula	C_{6}H_{13}NO_{4}
Molar mass	163.17 g/mol
- Except where otherwise noted, data are given for materials in their standard state (at 25 °C [77 °F], 100 kPa). verify (what is ?) Infobox references

Bicine is an organic compound used as a buffering agent. It is one of Good's buffers and has a pKa of 8.35 at 20 °C. It is prepared by the reaction of glycine with ethylene oxide, followed by hydrolysis of the resultant lactone.

Bicine is a contaminant in amine systems used for gas sweetening. It is formed by amine degradation in the presence of O_{2}, SO_{2}, H_{2}S or Thiosulfate.

== See also ==
- Tricine
