= McIlvaine buffer =

Type of chemical solution

McIlvaine buffer is a buffer solution composed of citric acid and disodium hydrogen phosphate, also known as citrate-phosphate buffer. It was introduced in 1921 by the United States agronomist Theodore Clinton McIlvaine (1875–1959) from West Virginia University, and it can be prepared in pH 2.2 to 8 by mixing two stock solutions.

== Applications ==
McIlvaine buffer can be used to prepare a water-soluble mounting medium when mixed 1:1 with glycerol.

== Contents ==
Preparation of McIlvaine buffer requires disodium phosphate and citric acid. One liter of 0.2M stock solution of disodium hydrogen phosphate can be prepared by dissolving 28.38g of disodium phosphate in water, and adding a quantity of water sufficient to make one liter. One liter of 0.1M stock solution of citric acid can be prepared by dissolving 19.21g of citric acid in water, and adding a quantity of water sufficient to make one liter. From these stock solutions, McIlvaine buffer can be prepared in accordance with the following table:

Mixing table for obtaining 20 mL of McIlvaine buffer
pH	0.2 M Na_{2}HPO_{4} (mL)	0.1 M citric acid (mL)
2.2	00.40	19.60
2.4	01.24	18.76
2.6	02.18	17.82
2.8	03.17	16.83
3.0	04.11	15.89
3.2	04.94	15.06
3.4	05.70	14.30
3.6	06.44	13.56
3.8	07.10	12.90
4.0	07.71	12.29
4.2	08.28	11.72
4.4	08.82	11.18
4.6	09.35	10.65
4.8	09.86	10.14
5.0	10.30	09.70
5.2	10.72	09.28
5.4	11.15	08.85
5.6	11.60	08.40
5.8	12.09	07.91
6.0	12.63	07.37
6.2	13.22	06.78
6.4	13.85	06.15
6.6	14.55	05.45
6.8	15.45	04.55
7.0	16.47	03.53
7.2	17.39	02.61
7.4	18.17	01.83
7.6	18.73	01.27
7.8	19.15	00.85
8.0	19.45	00.55
