= CAPS (buffer) =

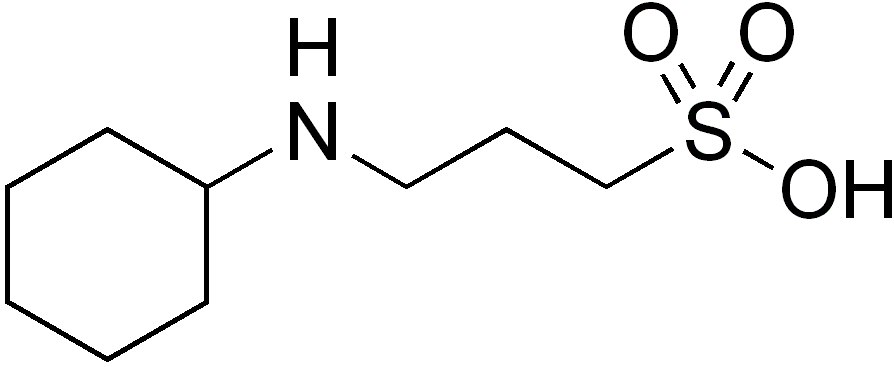

Names
- Preferred IUPAC name 3-(Cyclohexylamino)propane-1-sulfonic acid

Identifiers
CAS Number	1135-40-6
3D model (JSmol)	Interactive image
ChemSpider	63979
DrugBank	DB02219
ECHA InfoCard	100.013.175
EC Number	214-492-1
PubChem CID	70815
UNII	4W981O1LXP
CompTox Dashboard (EPA)	DTXSID3061554
- InChI: InChI=1S/C9H19NO3S/c11-14(12,13)8-4-7-10-9-5-2-1-3-6-9/h9-10H,1-8H2,(H,11,12,13) Key: PJWWRFATQTVXHA-UHFFFAOYSA-N; InChI=1/C9H19NO3S/c11-14(12,13)8-4-7-10-9-5-2-1-3-6-9/h9-10H,1-8H2,(H,11,12,13) Key: PJWWRFATQTVXHA-UHFFFAOYAU
- SMILES: C1CCC(CC1)NCCCS(=O)(=O)O

Properties
Chemical formula	C_{9}H_{19}NO_{3}S
Molar mass	221.32 g/mol
Melting point	>300 °C
Acidity (pK_{a})	10.4

Hazards
- GHS labelling
Pictograms	(GHS07: Exclamation mark)
Signal word	Warning
Hazard statements	H302, H315, H319, H335
Precautionary statements	P261, P264, P270, P271, P280, P301+P312, P302+P352, P304+P340, P305+P351+P338, P312, P321, P330, P332+P313, P337+P313, P362, P403+P233, P405, P501
- Except where otherwise noted, data are given for materials in their standard state (at 25 °C [77 °F], 100 kPa). verify (what is ?) Infobox references

CAPS is the common name for 3-(Cyclohexylamino)-1-propanesulfonic acid, a compound used as a buffering agent in biochemistry. The similar substance N-cyclohexyl-2-hydroxyl-3-aminopropanesulfonic acid (CAPSO) is also used as buffering agent in biochemistry. Its useful pH range is 9.7-11.1. CAPS is a Good's buffer that is chemically stable and is commonly used in biochemical and analytical applications such as capillary electrophoresis.

== Chemical Properties ==
CAPS is one of Good's buffers, a class of zwitterionic buffers widely used in biochemical research. These buffers are designed to be chemically inert, non-toxic, weakly chelating, and relatively stable across temperature changes. CAPS is highly soluble in water but exhibits low solubility in organic solvents, due to its high polarity.

== Chemical Reactivity and Applications ==
Compared to several other Good's buffers, CAPS shows different behavior in metal-catalyzed oxidation systems. Many Good's buffers will readily form nitrogen-centered free radicals in the presence of Au(III) at neutral pH, leading to the cleavage of DNA. CAPS, under the same conditions, does not produce detectable free radicals or induce DNA cleavage.

CAPS is used in capillary electrophoresis for the determination of pK_{a} values for compounds that ionize at high pH. This includes weakly basic and weakly acidic compounds, such as amines and phenols. Its effectiveness arises from its minimal interaction with analytes reducing interference and allowing measurements to more accurately reflect the analyte.

== See also ==
- CHES
- Good's buffers § List of Good's buffers
