= Tris =

- Chemical structure of tris

Names
- Preferred IUPAC name 2-Amino-2-(hydroxymethyl)propane-1,3-diol
- Other names TRIS, TRIS AMINO, Tris, Tris base, Tris buffer, Trizma, Trisamine, THAM, Tromethamine, Trometamol, Tromethane, Trisaminol, Tris(hydroxymethyl)aminomethane

Identifiers
| CAS Number | 77-86-1 (free base); 1185-53-1 (hydrochloride); 6850-28-8 (acetate salt) |
| 3D model (JSmol) | Interactive image |
| ChEBI | CHEBI:9754 |
| ChEMBL | ChEMBL1200391 |
| ChemSpider | 6257 |
| DrugBank | DB03754 |
| ECHA InfoCard | 100.000.969 |
| EC Number | 201-064-4 |
| IUPHAR/BPS | 7328 |
| KEGG | D00396 |
| PubChem CID | 6503 |
| RTECS number | TY2900000 |
| UNII | 023C2WHX2V; 383V75M34E (hydrochloride) |
| CompTox Dashboard (EPA) | DTXSID2023723 |
- InChI: InChI=1S/C4H11NO3/c5-4(1-6,2-7)3-8/h6-8H,1-3,5H2 Key: LENZDBCJOHFCAS-UHFFFAOYSA-N; InChI=1/C4H11NO3/c5-4(1-6,2-7)3-8/h6-8H,1-3,5H2 Key: LENZDBCJOHFCAS-UHFFFAOYAN
- SMILES: OCC(N)(CO)CO

Properties
| Chemical formula | C_{4}H_{11}NO_{3} |
| Molar mass | 121.136 g·mol^{−1} |
| Appearance | White crystalline powder |
| Density | 1.328g/cm^{3} |
| Melting point | >175-176 °C (448-449 K) |
| Boiling point | 219 °C (426 °F; 492 K) |
| Solubility in water | ~50 g/100 mL (25 °C) |
| Acidity (pK_{a}) | 8.07 (conjugate acid) |

Pharmacology
| ATC code | B05BB03 (WHO) B05XX02 (WHO) |

Hazards
- Occupational safety and health (OHS/OSH)
| Main hazards | Irritant |
- GHS labelling
| Pictograms | (GHS07: Exclamation mark) |
| Signal word | Warning |
| Hazard statements | H315, H319, H335 |
| Precautionary statements | P261, P264, P271, P280, P302+P352, P304+P340, P305+P351+P338, P312, P332+P313, P362, P403+P233, P405 |
| NFPA 704 (fire diamond) | 2 |
| Flash point | Non-flammable |
| Safety data sheet (SDS) | External MSDS |
- Except where otherwise noted, data are given for materials in their standard state (at 25 °C [77 °F], 100 kPa). verify (what is ?) Infobox references

Tris, or tris(hydroxymethyl)aminomethane, or known during medical use as tromethamine or THAM, is an organic compound with the formula (HOCH_{2})_{3}CNH_{2}. It is extensively used in biochemistry and molecular biology as a component of buffer solutions such as in TAE and TBE buffers, especially for solutions of nucleic acids. It contains a primary amine and thus undergoes the reactions associated with typical amines, e.g., condensations with aldehydes. Tris also complexes with metal ions in solution. In medicine, tris (known as tromethamine) is occasionally used as a drug, given in intensive care for its properties as a buffer for the treatment of severe metabolic acidosis in specific circumstances. Some medications are formulated as the "tromethamine salt" including Hemabate (carboprost as trometamol salt), and "ketorolac trometamol". In 2023 a strain of Pseudomonas hunanensis was found to be able to degrade TRIS buffer.

Since Tris's pKa is more strongly temperature dependent, its use is not recommended in biochemical applications requiring consistent pH over a range of temperatures. Moreover, the temperature dependence of the pKa (and in turn buffer solution pH) makes pH adjustment difficult. (E.g., the 'room temperature' pH adjustment would not translate to 'measurement conditions' pH, unless care is taken to calculate the effect of temperature, see below.)

== Buffering features ==
The conjugate acid of tris has a pK_{a} of 8.07 at 25 °C, which implies that the buffer has an effective pH range between 7.1 and 9.1 (pK_{a} ± 1) at room temperature.

=== Buffer details ===
- In general, as temperature decreases from 25 °C to 5 °C the pH of a tris buffer will increase an average of 0.03 units per degree. As temperature rises from 25 °C to 37 °C, the pH of a tris buffer will decrease an average of 0.025 units per degree.
- In general, a 10-fold increase in tris buffer concentration will lead to a 0.05 unit increase in pH and vice versa.
- Silver-containing single-junction pH electrodes (e.g., silver chloride electrodes) are incompatible with tris since an Ag-tris precipitate forms which clogs the junction. Double-junction electrodes are resistant to this problem, and non-silver containing electrodes are immune.

=== Buffer inhibition ===
- Tris inhibits a number of enzymes, and therefore should be used with care when studying proteins.
- Tris can also inhibit enzyme activity via chelation of metal ions.

== Preparation ==
Tris is prepared industrially by the exhaustive condensation of nitromethane with formaldehyde under basic conditions (i.e. repeated Henry reactions) to produce the intermediate (HOCH_{2})_{3}CNO_{2}, which is subsequently hydrogenated to give the final product.

== Uses ==
The useful buffer range for tris (pH 7–9) coincides with the physiological pH typical of most living organisms. This, and its low cost, make tris one of the most common buffers in the biology/biochemistry laboratory. Tris is also used as a primary standard to standardize acid solutions for chemical analysis.

Tris is used to increase permeability of cell membranes. It is a component of the Moderna COVID-19 vaccine and the Pfizer-BioNTech COVID-19 vaccine for use in children 5 through 11 years of age.

=== Medical ===
Tris (usually known as THAM in this context) is used as alternative to sodium bicarbonate in the treatment of metabolic acidosis.

== See also ==
- MOPS
- HEPES
- MES
- Common buffer compounds used in biology
