= CHES (buffer) =

Names
- Preferred IUPAC name 2-(Cyclohexylamino)ethane-1-sulfonic acid
- Other names: N-Cyclohexyl-2-aminoethanesulfonic acid; N-Cyclohexyltaurine; 2-(N-cyclohexylamino)ethane sulfonic acid

Identifiers
CAS Number	103-47-9
3D model (JSmol)	Interactive image
ChEBI	CHEBI:44302
ChemSpider	60260
DrugBank	DB03309
ECHA InfoCard	100.002.832
MeSH	2-(N-cyclohexylamino)ethanesulfonic+acid
PubChem CID	66898
UNII	71X53V3RZ1
CompTox Dashboard (EPA)	DTXSID7059274
- InChI: InChI=1S/C8H17NO3S/c10-13(11,12)7-6-9-8-4-2-1-3-5-8/h8-9H,1-7H2,(H,10,11,12) Key: MKWKNSIESPFAQN-UHFFFAOYSA-N; InChI=1/C8H17NO3S/c10-13(11,12)7-6-9-8-4-2-1-3-5-8/h8-9H,1-7H2,(H,10,11,12) Key: MKWKNSIESPFAQN-UHFFFAOYAH
- SMILES: O = S( = O)(O)CCNC1CCCCC1

Properties
Chemical formula	C_{8}H_{17}NO_{3}S
Molar mass	207.29 g·mol^{−1}
Acidity (pK_{a})	9.3
- Except where otherwise noted, data are given for materials in their standard state (at 25 °C [77 °F], 100 kPa). verify (what is ?) Infobox references

CHES, 2-(Cyclohexylamino)ethane-1-sulfonic acid, is a buffering agent. CHES buffers have a useful range of pH 8.6–10.

It typically appears as a white crystalline powder.

== Effect of impurities ==
Commercial prep of CHES (and other sulfonylethyl buffers like BES, MES, and PIPES) can contain a contaminant oligo(vinylsulfonic acid) (OVS), which is a polyanionic mimic of RNA, and can be a potent (pM) inhibitor of RNA binding proteins and enzymes.
