= Ethanesulfonic acid =

Chemical compound

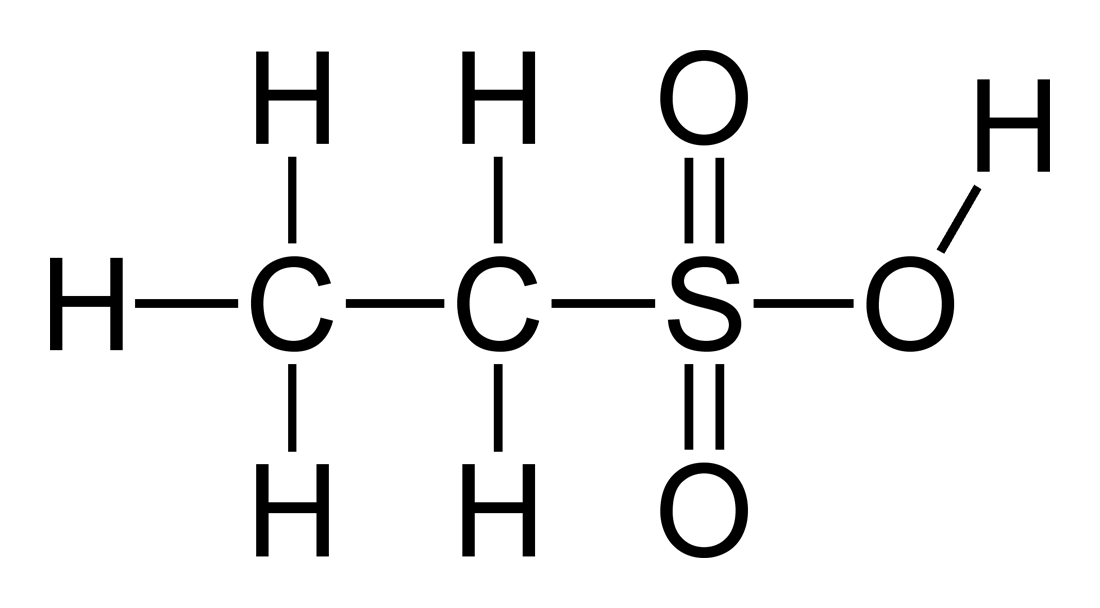
- Ethanesulfonic acid 2D

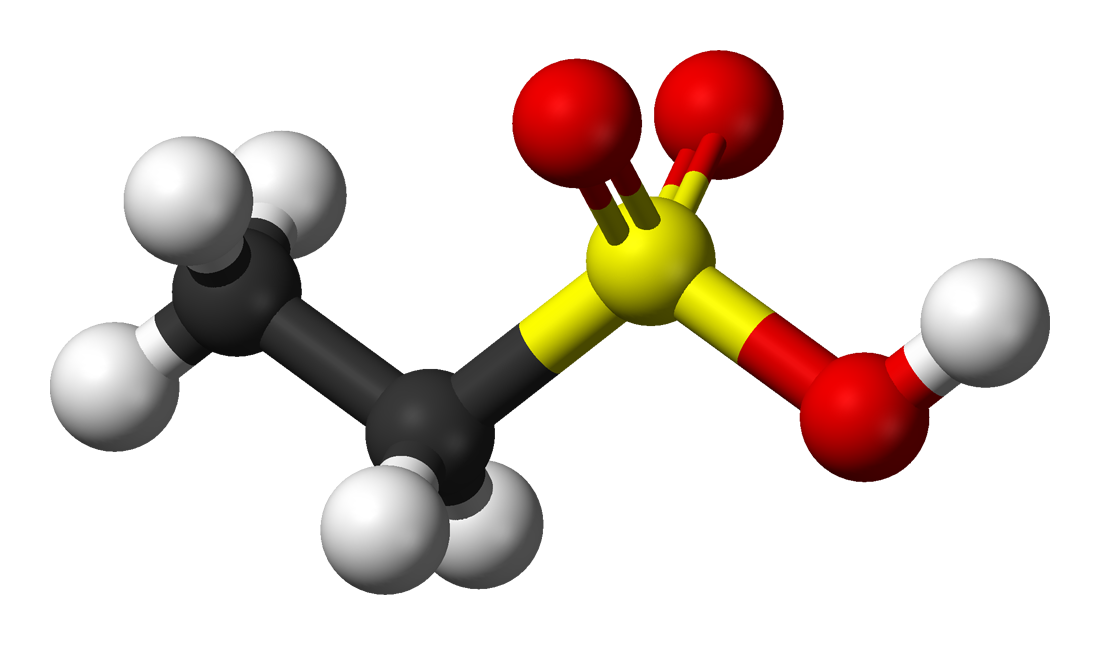
Ethanesulfonic acid 3D
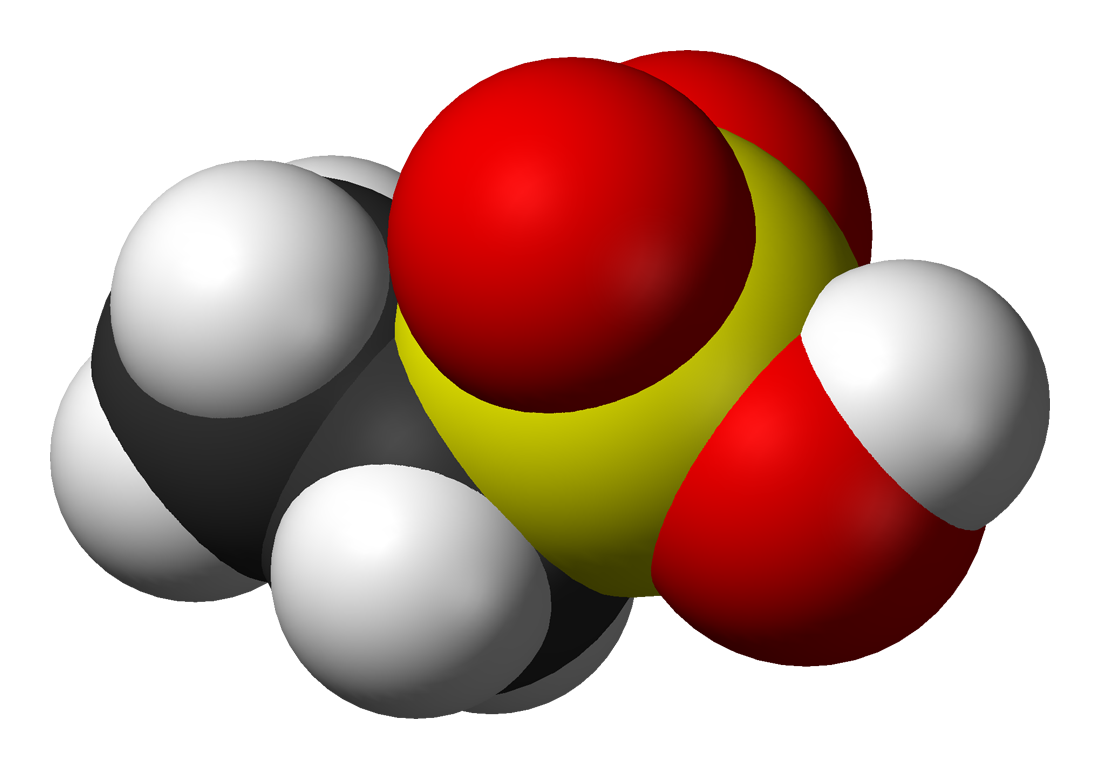
Ethanesulfonic acid 3D bonds

Names
- Preferred IUPAC name Ethanesulfonic acid
- Other names Esylic acid, ethylsulfonic acid

Identifiers
CAS Number	594-45-6
3D model (JSmol)	Interactive image
ChEBI	CHEBI:42465
ChemSpider	11178
ECHA InfoCard	100.008.950
EC Number	209-843-0
PubChem CID	11668
UNII	599310E3U2
CompTox Dashboard (EPA)	DTXSID5060487
- InChI: InChI=1S/C2H6O3S/c1-2-6(3,4)5/h2H2,1H3,(H,3,4,5); InChI=1S/C2H6O3S/c1-2-6(3,4)5/h2H2,1H3,(H,3,4,5) Key: CCIVGXIOQKPBKL-UHFFFAOYSA-N
- SMILES: CCS(O)(=O)=O

Properties
Chemical formula	C_{2}H_{6}O_{3}S
Molar mass	110.13 g·mol^{−1}
Appearance	Colorless liquid
Density	1.35 g/mL
Melting point	−17 °C (1 °F; 256 K)
Boiling point	122–123 °C (252–253 °F; 395–396 K) at 0.01 mmHg
Solubility in water	Soluble
log P	−0.37
Acidity (pK_{a})	−1.68

Hazards
- GHS labelling
Pictograms	(GHS05: Corrosive) (GHS07: Exclamation mark)
Signal word	Danger
Hazard statements	H290, H302, H302+H312, H312, H314, H335
Precautionary statements	P234, P260, P264, P264+P265, P270, P271, P280, P301+P317, P301+P330+P331, P302+P352, P302+P361+P354, P304+P340, P305+P354+P338, P316, P317, P319, P321, P330, P362+P364, P363, P390, P403+P233, P405, P501
- Except where otherwise noted, data are given for materials in their standard state (at 25 °C [77 °F], 100 kPa). verify (what is ?) Infobox references

Ethanesulfonic acid (esylic acid) is a sulfonic acid with the chemical formula C_{2}H_{6}O_{3}S or CH_{3}CH_{2}SO_{3}H. The conjugate base is known as ethanesulfonate or, when used in pharmaceutical formulations, as esilate. It is a colorless liquid.
