= Buffer solution =

Aqueous solution of a weak acid and its conjugate base

A buffer solution is a solution whose pH does not change significantly on dilution or if a small amount of strong acid or base is added to it at constant temperature. Buffer capacity is used to measure the resistance to pH change of a buffer solution.

Buffer solutions are used to maintain pH at a nearly constant value in a wide variety of chemical applications. In nature, many living systems use buffering to regulate pH. For example, the bicarbonate buffering system serves to regulate the pH of blood, and bicarbonate also acts as a buffer in the ocean.

== Principles ==
Figure 1. Simulated titration of an acidified solution of a weak acid (pK_{a} = 4.7) with alkali

Buffer solutions resist pH change because of a chemical equilibrium between the weak acid HA and its conjugate base A^{−}:

HA ⇌ H^{+} + A^{−}

When some strong acid is added to an equilibrium mixture of the weak acid and its conjugate base, hydrogen ions (H^{+}) are added, and the equilibrium is shifted to the left, in accordance with Le Chatelier's principle. Because of this, the hydrogen ion concentration increases by less than the amount expected for the quantity of strong acid added. Similarly, if strong alkali is added to the mixture, the hydrogen ion concentration decreases by less than the amount expected for the quantity of alkali added. In Figure 1, the effect is illustrated by the simulated titration of a weak acid with pK_{a} = 4.7. The relative concentration of undissociated acid is shown in blue, and that of its conjugate base in red. The pH changes relatively slowly in the buffer region, pH = pK_{a} ± 1, centered at pH = 4.7, where [HA] = [A^{−}]. The hydrogen ion concentration decreases by less than the amount expected because most of the added hydroxide ion is consumed in the reaction

OH^{−} + HA → H_{2}O + A^{−}

and only a little is consumed in the neutralization reaction (which is the reaction that results in an increase in pH)

OH^{−} + H^{+} → H_{2}O.

Once the acid is more than 95% deprotonated, the pH rises rapidly because most of the added alkali is consumed in the neutralization reaction.

=== Buffer capacity and buffer index ===
The buffer capacity ($\beta$) is a measure of the amount (number of moles or gram-equivalents, $\Delta n$) of a strong acid or base added to a given volume ($V$) of solution required to change its pH by a given amount ($\Delta pH$).

$$\beta = \frac{\Delta n}{\Delta pH}$$

The buffer capacity ($\beta$) is highest when the addition of a large amount ($\Delta n$) of acid or base to the solution volume produces only a small pH change ($\Delta pH$).

Thus buffer capacity and the closely related buffer index are quantitative measures of a buffer solution's resistance to changes in pH in response to changes in acid or alkali concentration. Buffer capacity and buffer index are quasi-synonyms (both are denoted $\beta$), but their definitions differ slightly in the extent of pH change they consider.

The concept of buffer capacity, how to determine it from acid-base titration measurements, and its mathematical significance in relation to the dissociation constant ($pK_{a}$) of the buffer solution and its behaviour in response to an external perturbation were introduced by the Dutch-American biochemist Donald Dexter Van Slyke in 1922.

The buffer index (also $\beta$) considers an infinitesimal change in pH (for mathematical calculation purposes), whereas the buffer capacity considers a macroscopic pH change of 1 pH unit (for titration measurements).

Thus

$$\beta = \frac{dn}{d(pH)}$$

When taking also into account the volume ($V$) of the titrated buffer solution, its buffer capacity ($\beta$) can be defined in term of concentration changes:

$$\beta = \frac{1}{V} \cdot \frac{\Delta n}{\Delta pH}$$

Where:

- V: the volume of the buffer solution (1 L)
- Δn: the quantity (in mol) of added strong acid or base
- ΔpH: the absolute value of the difference in pH (before and after addition)

When considering an infinitesimal variation in concentration $dC = \frac {\Delta n} {V} = \frac {\delta n} {V}$ and an infinitesimal change in pH, $d(\mathrm{pH}$), the buffer capacity can be expressed as a buffer index ($\beta$):

$$\beta = \frac{dC_b}{d(\mathrm{pH})},$$

where $dC_b$ is an infinitesimal change in base concentration in the buffer solution due to the amount of base added, or

$$\beta = -\frac{dC_a}{d(\mathrm{pH})},$$

where $dC_a$ is an infinitesimal change in acid concentration in the buffer solution due to the amount of acid added.

pH is defined as −log_{10}[H^{+}], and d(pH) is an infinitesimal change in pH.

With either definition, the buffer capacity for a weak acid HA with dissociation constant K_{a} can be expressed as
$$\beta = 2.303 \left([\ce{H+}] + \frac{T_\ce{HA} K_a[\ce{H+}]}{(K_a + [\ce{H+}])^2} + \frac{K_\text{w}}{[\ce{H+}]}\right),$$
where [H^{+}] is the concentration of hydrogen ions, and $T_\text{HA}$ is the total concentration of added acid. K_{w} is the equilibrium constant for self-ionization of water, equal to 1.0×10^{−14}. Note that in solution H^{+} exists as the hydronium ion H_{3}O^{+}, and further aquation of the hydronium ion has negligible effect on the dissociation equilibrium, except at very high acid concentration.

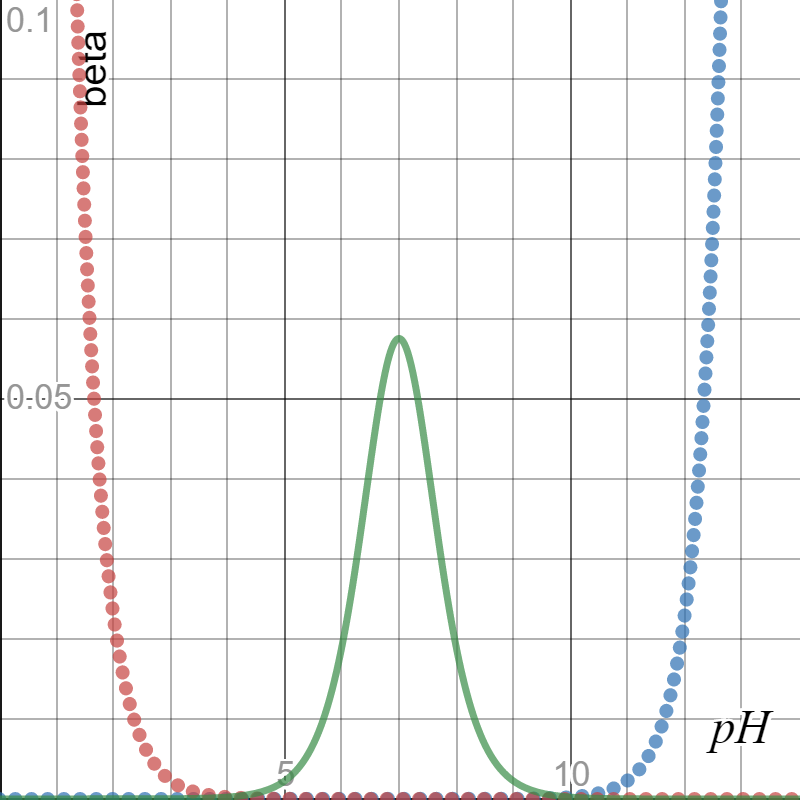
Figure 2. Buffer capacity β for a 0.1 M solution of a weak acid with a pK_{a} = 7

This equation shows that there are three regions of raised buffer capacity (see figure 2).

- In the central region of the curve (colored green on the plot), the second term is dominant, and
  $$\beta \approx 2.303 \frac{T_\ce{HA} K_a[\ce{H+}]}{(K_a + [\ce{H+}])^2}.$$
  Buffer capacity rises to a local maximum at pH = pK_{a}. The height of this peak depends on the value of pK_{a}. Buffer capacity is negligible when the concentration [HA] of buffering agent is very small and increases with increasing concentration of the buffering agent. Some authors show only this region in graphs of buffer capacity.
  Buffer capacity falls to 33% of the maximum value at pH = pK_{a} ± 1, to 10% at pH = pK_{a} ± 1.5 and to 1% at pH = pK_{a} ± 2. For this reason, the most useful range is approximately pK_{a} ± 1. When choosing a buffer for use at a specific pH, it should have a pK_{a} value as close as possible to that pH.
- With strongly acidic solutions, pH less than about 2 (coloured red on the plot), the first term in the equation dominates, and buffer capacity rises exponentially with decreasing pH:
  $$\beta \approx 10^{-\mathrm{pH}}.$$
  This results from the fact that the second and third terms become negligible at very low pH. This term is independent of the presence or absence of a buffering agent.
- With strongly alkaline solutions, pH more than about 12 (coloured blue on the plot), the third term in the equation dominates, and buffer capacity rises exponentially with increasing pH:
  $$\beta \approx 10^{\mathrm{pH} - \mathrm{p}K_\text{w}}.$$
  This results from the fact that the first and second terms become negligible at very high pH. This term is also independent of the presence or absence of a buffering agent.

== Calculating buffer pH ==
=== Monoprotic acids ===
First write down the equilibrium expression

HA ⇌ A^{−} + H^{+}

This shows that when the acid dissociates, equal amounts of hydrogen ion and anion are produced. The equilibrium concentrations of these three components can be calculated in an ICE table (ICE standing for "initial, change, equilibrium").

ICE table for a monoprotic acid
	[HA]	[A^{−}]	[H^{+}]
I	C_{0}	0	y
C	−x	x	x
E	C_{0} − x	x	x + y

The first row, labelled I, lists the initial conditions: the concentration of acid is C_{0}, initially undissociated, so the concentrations of A^{−} and H^{+} would be zero; y is the initial concentration of added strong acid, such as hydrochloric acid. If strong alkali, such as sodium hydroxide, is added, then y will have a negative sign because alkali removes hydrogen ions from the solution. The second row, labelled C for "change", specifies the changes that occur when the acid dissociates. The acid concentration decreases by an amount −x, and the concentrations of A^{−} and H^{+} both increase by an amount +x. This follows from the equilibrium expression. The third row, labelled E for "equilibrium", adds together the first two rows and shows the concentrations at equilibrium.

To find x, use the formula for the equilibrium constant in terms of concentrations:
$$K_\text{a} = \frac{[\ce{H+}] [\ce{A-}]}{[\ce{HA}]}.$$

Substitute the concentrations with the values found in the last row of the ICE table:
$$K_\text{a} = \frac{x(x + y)}{C_0 - x}.$$

Simplify to
$$x^2 + (K_\text{a} + y) x - K_\text{a} C_0 = 0.$$

With specific values for C_{0}, K_{a} and y, this equation can be solved for x. Assuming that pH = −log_{10}[H^{+}], the pH can be calculated as pH = −log_{10}(x + y).

=== Polyprotic acids ===
% species formation calculated for a 10-millimolar solution of citric acid

Polyprotic acids are acids that can lose more than one proton. The constant for dissociation of the first proton may be denoted as K_{a1}, and the constants for dissociation of successive protons as K_{a2}, etc. Citric acid is an example of a polyprotic acid H_{3}A, as it can lose three protons.

Stepwise dissociation constants
Equilibrium	Citric acid
H_{3}A ⇌ H_{2}A^{−} + H^{+}	pK_{a1} = 3.13
H_{2}A^{−} ⇌ HA^{2−} + H^{+}	pK_{a2} = 4.76
HA^{2−} ⇌ A^{3−} + H^{+}	pK_{a3} = 6.40

When the difference between successive pK_{a} values is less than about 3, there is overlap between the pH range of existence of the species in equilibrium. The smaller the difference, the more the overlap. In the case of citric acid, the overlap is extensive and solutions of citric acid are buffered over the whole range of pH 2.5 to 7.5.

Calculation of the pH with a polyprotic acid requires a speciation calculation to be performed. In the case of citric acid, this entails the solution of the two equations of mass balance:

$$\begin{align}
C_\ce{A} &= [\ce{A^3-}]+ \beta_1 [\ce{A^3-}][\ce{H+}] + \beta_2 [\ce{A^3-}][\ce{H+}]^2 + \beta_3 [\ce{A^3-}][\ce{H+}]^3, \\
C_\ce{H} &= [\ce{H+}] + \beta_1 [\ce{A^3-}][\ce{H+}] + 2\beta_2 [\ce{A^3-}][\ce{H+}]^2 + 3\beta_3 [\ce{A^3-}][\ce{H+}]^3 - K_\text{w}[\ce{H+}]^{-1}.
\end{align}$$

C_{A} is the analytical concentration of the acid, C_{H} is the analytical concentration of added hydrogen ions, β_{q} are the cumulative association constants. K_{w} is the constant for self-ionization of water. There are two non-linear simultaneous equations in two unknown quantities [A^{3−}] and [H^{+}]. Many computer programs are available to do this calculation. The speciation diagram for citric acid was produced with the program HySS.

N.B. The numbering of cumulative, overall constants is the reverse of the numbering of the stepwise, dissociation constants.

Relationship between cumulative association constant (β) values and stepwise dissociation constant (K) values for a tribasic acid.
Equilibrium	Relationship
A^{3−} + H^{+} ⇌ AH^{2+}	Log β_{1}= pk_{a3}
A^{3−} + 2H^{+} ⇌ AH_{2}^{+}	Log β_{2} =pk_{a2} + pk_{a3}
A^{3−} + 3H^{+}⇌ AH_{3}	Log β_{3} = pk_{a1} + pk_{a2} + pk_{a3}

Cumulative association constants are used in general-purpose computer programs such as the one used to obtain the speciation diagram above.

== Applications ==
The pH of a solution containing a buffering agent can only vary within a narrow range, regardless of what else may be present in the solution. In biological systems this is an essential condition for enzymes to function correctly. For example, in human blood a mixture of carbonic acid (H_{2}CO_{3}) and bicarbonate (HCO^{−}_{3}) is present in the plasma fraction; this constitutes the major mechanism for maintaining the pH of blood between 7.35 and 7.45. Outside this narrow range (7.40 ± 0.05 pH unit), acidosis and alkalosis metabolic conditions rapidly develop, ultimately leading to death if the correct buffering capacity is not rapidly restored.

If the pH value of a solution rises or falls too much, the effectiveness of an enzyme decreases in a process, known as denaturation, which is usually irreversible. The majority of biological samples that are used in research are kept in a buffer solution, often phosphate buffered saline (PBS) at pH 7.4.

In industry, buffering agents are used in fermentation processes and in setting the correct conditions for dyes used in colouring fabrics. They are also used in chemical analysis and calibration of pH meters.

=== Simple buffering agents ===
Buffering agent	pK_{a}	Useful pH range
Citric acid	3.13, 4.76, 6.40	2.1–7.4
Acetic acid	4.7	3.8–5.8
KH_{2}PO_{4}	7.2	6.2–8.2
CHES	9.3	8.3–10.3
Borate	9.24	8.25–10.25

For buffers in acid regions, the pH may be adjusted to a desired value by adding a strong acid such as hydrochloric acid to the particular buffering agent. For alkaline buffers, a strong base such as sodium hydroxide may be added. Alternatively, a buffer mixture can be made from a mixture of an acid and its conjugate base. For example, an acetate buffer can be made from a mixture of acetic acid and sodium acetate. Similarly, an alkaline buffer can be made from a mixture of the base and its conjugate acid.

=== "Universal" buffer mixtures ===
By combining substances with pK_{a} values differing by only two or less and adjusting the pH, a wide range of buffers can be obtained. Citric acid is a useful component of a buffer mixture because it has three pK_{a} values, separated by less than two. The buffer range can be extended by adding other buffering agents. The following mixtures (McIlvaine's buffer solutions) have a buffer range of pH 3 to 8.

0.2 M Na_{2}HPO_{4} (mL)	0.1 M citric acid (mL)	pH
20.55	79.45	3.0
38.55	61.45	4.0
51.50	48.50	5.0
63.15	36.85	6.0
82.35	17.65	7.0
97.25	2.75	8.0

A mixture containing citric acid, monopotassium phosphate, boric acid, and diethyl barbituric acid can be made to cover the pH range 2.6 to 12.

Other universal buffers are the Carmody buffer and the Britton–Robinson buffer, developed in 1931.

=== Common buffer compounds used in biology ===
For effective range see Buffer capacity, above. Also see Good's buffers for the historic design principles and favourable properties of these buffer substances in biochemical applications.

Common name (chemical name)	Structure	pK_{a}, 25 °C	Temp. effect, dpH/dT (K^{−1})	Mol. weight
TAPS, ([tris(hydroxymethyl)methylamino]propanesulfonic acid)		8.43	−0.018	243.3
Bicine, (2-(bis(2-hydroxyethyl)amino)acetic acid)		8.35	−0.018	163.2
Tris, (tris(hydroxymethyl)aminomethane, or 2-amino-2-(hydroxymethyl)propane-1,3-diol)		8.07 (Note: Tris is a base, the pK_{a} = 8.07 refers to its conjugate acid.)	−0.028	121.14
Tricine, (N-[tris(hydroxymethyl)methyl]glycine)		8.05	−0.021	179.2
TAPSO, (3-[N-tris(hydroxymethyl)methylamino]-2-hydroxypropanesulfonic acid)		7.635		259.3
HEPES, (4-(2-hydroxyethyl)-1-piperazineethanesulfonic acid)		7.48	−0.014	238.3
TES, (2-[[1,3-dihydroxy-2-(hydroxymethyl)propan-2-yl]amino]ethanesulfonic acid)		7.40	−0.020	229.20
MOPS, (3-(N-morpholino)propanesulfonic acid)		7.20	−0.015	209.3
PIPES, (piperazine-N,N′-bis(2-ethanesulfonic acid))		6.76	−0.008	302.4
Cacodylate, (dimethylarsenic acid)		6.27		138.0
MES, (2-(N-morpholino)ethanesulfonic acid)		6.15	−0.011	195.2

== See also ==
- Henderson–Hasselbalch equation
- Good's buffers
- Common-ion effect
- Metal ion buffer
- Mineral redox buffer
- TSE buffer
