= Carbonite =

Carbonite may refer to:

- Carbonite (explosive), one of the earliest and most successful coal-mining explosives
- Carbonite (ion), the inorganic anion that forms the conjugate base of dihydroxymethylidene with the chemical formula [CO_{2}]^{2−}
- Carbonite (online backup), an online backup service
- Carbonite (Star Wars), a fictional substance, most notably used to imprison Han Solo in the film The Empire Strikes Back
- Carbonite-2, an imagery technology demonstrator satellite
