= Mixing ratio =

Abundance of one component of a mixture relative to others

In chemistry and physics, the dimensionless mixing ratio is the abundance of one component of a mixture relative to that of all other components. The term can refer either to mole ratio (see concentration) or mass ratio (see stoichiometry).

== In atmospheric chemistry and meteorology ==
=== Mole ratio ===
In atmospheric chemistry, mixing ratio usually refers to the mole ratio r_{i}, which is defined as the amount of a constituent n_{i} divided by the total amount of all other constituents in a mixture:

$$r_i = \frac{n_i}{n_\mathrm{tot}-n_i}$$

The mole ratio is also called amount ratio. If n_{i} is much smaller than n_{tot} (which is the case for atmospheric trace constituents), the mole ratio is almost identical to the mole fraction.

=== Mass ratio ===
In meteorology, mixing ratio usually refers to the mass ratio of water $\zeta$, which is defined as the mass of water $m_\mathrm{H2O}$ divided by the mass of dry air ($m_\mathrm{air}-m_\mathrm{H2O}$) in a given air parcel:

$$\zeta = \frac{m_\mathrm{H2O}}{m_\mathrm{air}-m_\mathrm{H2O}}$$

The unit is typically given in $\mathrm{g}\,\mathrm{kg}^{-1}$. The definition is similar to that of specific humidity.

== Mixing ratio of mixtures or solutions ==
Two binary solutions of different compositions or even two pure components can be mixed with various mixing ratios by masses, moles, or volumes.

The mass fraction of the resulting solution from mixing solutions with masses m_{1} and m_{2} and mass fractions w_{1} and w_{2} is given by:

$$w = \frac{w_1 m_1 + w_2 m_1 r_m}{m_1 + m_1 r_m}$$

where m_{1} can be simplified from numerator and denominator

$$w = \frac{w_1 + w_2 r_m}{1 +  r_m}$$

and

$$r_m = \frac{m_2}{m_1}$$

is the mass mixing ratio of the two solutions.

By substituting the densities ρ_{i}(w_{i}) and considering equal volumes of different concentrations one gets:

$$w = \frac{w_1\rho_1(w_1) + w_2\rho_2(w_2)}{\rho_1(w_1) + \rho_2(w_2)}$$

Considering a volume mixing ratio r_{V(21)}

$$w = \frac{w_1\rho_1(w_1) + w_2\rho_2(w_2) r_V}{\rho_1(w_1) + \rho_2(w_2) r_V}$$

The formula can be extended to more than two solutions with mass mixing ratios

$$r_{m1} = \frac{m_2}{m_1} \quad r_{m2} = \frac{m_3}{m_1}$$

to be mixed giving:

$$w = \frac{w_1 m_1 + w_2 m_1 r_{m1} + w_3 m_1 r_{m2}}{m_1 + m_1 r_{m1} + m_1 r_{m2}} = \frac{w_1 + w_2 r_{m1} + w_3 r_{m2}}{1 + r_{m1} + r_{m2}}$$

=== Volume additivity ===
The condition to get a partially ideal solution on mixing is that the volume of the resulting mixture V to equal double the volume V_{s} of each solution mixed in equal volumes due to the additivity of volumes. The resulting volume can be found from the mass balance equation involving densities of the mixed and resulting solutions and equalising it to 2:

$$V = \frac{(\rho_1 + \rho_2) V_\mathrm{s}}{\rho}, V =2V_\mathrm{s}$$

implies

$$\frac{\rho_1 + \rho_2}{\rho} = 2$$

Of course for real solutions inequalities appear instead of the last equality.

=== Solvent mixtures mixing ratios ===
Mixtures of different solvents can have interesting features like anomalous conductivity (electrolytic) of particular lyonium ions and lyate ions generated by molecular autoionization of protic and aprotic solvents due to Grotthuss mechanism of ion hopping depending on the mixing ratios. Examples may include hydronium and hydroxide ions in water and water alcohol mixtures, alkoxonium and alkoxide ions in the same mixtures, ammonium and amide ions in liquid and supercritical ammonia, and alkylammonium and alkylamide ions in ammines mixtures.
