= Serguei Lvov =

Serguei N. Lvov is Professor of Energy and Mineral Engineering & Materials Science and Engineering and Director of Electrochemical Technologies Program at the EMS Energy Institute of the Pennsylvania State University. He received a D.Sc. degree in Physical Chemistry at St. Petersburg State University of Russia in 1992. Prior to his tenure at Penn State he worked at St. Petersburg School of Mines and the Russian Academy of Science. He was visiting scholar at the University of Venice (Italy), the University of Delaware (USA) and the National Centre for Scientific Research at Vandoeuvre-les-Nancy (France). His main area of research is electrochemistry and thermodynamics of aqueous systems under extreme environments such as elevated temperatures and pressures or high concentrated solutions. He has carried out an innovative work to develop high temperature/high pressure flow-through electrochemical techniques including potentiometric, electrochemical kinetics, corrosion and electrophoresis studies. He has developed an internationally accepted formulation for the self-ionization of water covering a wide range temperatures and densities. He is author of more than 180 papers, 6 book chapters, and 3 books. His recent book Introduction to Electrochemical Science and Engineering was published by CRC Press in 2015.
