= Amphoterism =

Chemical property of reacting with either an acid or base

In chemistry, an amphoteric compound (from Greek amphoteros 'both') is a molecule or ion that can react both as an acid and as a base. What exactly this can mean depends on which definitions of acids and bases are being used.

== Etymology and terminology ==
Amphoteric is derived from the Greek word amphoteroi (ἀμφότεροι) meaning "both". Related words in acid-base chemistry are amphichromatic and amphichroic, both describing substances such as acid-base indicators which give one colour on reaction with an acid and another colour on reaction with a base.

=== Amphiprotism ===
Amphiprotism is exhibited by compounds with both Brønsted acidic and basic properties. A prime example is H_{2}O. Amphiprotic molecules can either donate or accept a proton (H^{+}). Amino acids (and proteins) are amphiprotic molecules because of their amine (−NH_{2}) and carboxylic acid (−COOH) groups.

=== Ampholytes ===
Ampholytes are zwitterions ‒ molecules or ions that contain both acidic and basic functional groups. Amino acids H_{2}N−RCH−CO_{2}H have both a basic group −NH_{2} and an acidic group −COOH. Often such species exists as several structures in chemical equilibrium:

H_{2}N−CRH−CO_{2}H + H_{2}O ⇌ H_{2}N−CRH−COO^{−} + H_{3}O^{+} ⇌ H_{3}N^{+}−CRH−COOH + HO^{−} ⇌ H_{3}N^{+}−CRH−COO^{−} + H_{2}O

In approximately neutral aqueous solution (pH ≅ 7), the basic amino group is mostly protonated and the carboxylic acid is mostly deprotonated, so that the predominant species is the zwitterion H_{3}N^{+}−RCH−COO^{−}. The pH at which the average charge is zero is known as the molecule's isoelectric point. Ampholytes are used to establish a stable pH gradient for use in isoelectric focusing.

Metal oxides which react with both acids as well as bases to produce salts and water are known as amphoteric oxides. Many metals (such as zinc, tin, lead, aluminium, and beryllium) form amphoteric oxides or hydroxides. Aluminium oxide (Al_{2}O_{3}) is an example of an amphoteric oxide. Amphoterism depends on the oxidation states of the oxide. Amphoteric oxides include lead(II) oxide and zinc oxide, among many others.

== pH calculation ==
The pH of a solution of an amphoteric substance HA is given by the formula:
$$[H^+] = \sqrt{ \frac{K_1K_2[HA] + K_wK_1}{[HA] + K_1}}$$
where K_{1} and K_{2} are the acid dissociation constants for H_{2}A^{+} and A^{-}, respectively.
Typically, $[HA]$ is nearly equal to the formal concentration of HA, thus the formula is usually written as:
$$[H^+] = \sqrt{ \frac{K_1K_2F + K_wK_1}{F + K_1}}$$
In most cases, $F >> K_1$ and $K_1K_2F >> K_wK_1$, so the formula is simplified to:
$$[H^+] = \sqrt{ K_1K_2 },$$
or
$$pH = \frac{pK_1 + pK_2}{2}.$$

== Amphiprotic molecules ==
According to the Brønsted-Lowry theory of acids and bases, acids are proton donors and bases are proton acceptors. An amphiprotic molecule (or ion) can either donate or accept a proton, thus acting either as an acid or a base. Water, amino acids, hydrogencarbonate ion (or bicarbonate ion) HCO^{−}_{3}, dihydrogen phosphate ion H_{2}PO^{−}_{4}, and hydrogensulfate ion (or bisulfate ion) HSO^{−}_{4} are common examples of amphiprotic species. Since they can donate a proton, all amphiprotic substances contain a hydrogen atom. Also, since they can act like an acid or a base, they are amphoteric.

=== Examples ===
The water molecule is amphoteric in aqueous solution. It can either gain a proton to form a hydronium ion H_{3}O^{+}, or else lose a proton to form a hydroxide ion OH^{−}.

Another possibility is the molecular autoionization reaction between two water molecules, in which one water molecule acts as an acid and another as a base.

H_{2}O + H_{2}O ⇌ H_{3}O^{+} + HO^{−}

The bicarbonate ion, HCO^{−}_{3}, is amphoteric as it can act as either an acid or a base:

As an acid, losing a proton: HCO^{−}_{3} + OH^{−} ⇌ CO^{2−}_{3} + H_{2}O
As a base, accepting a proton: HCO^{−}_{3} + H^{+} ⇌ H_{2}CO_{3}

Note: in dilute aqueous solution the formation of the hydronium ion, H_{3}O^{+}(aq), is effectively complete, so that hydration of the proton can be ignored in relation to the equilibria.

Other examples of inorganic polyprotic acids include anions of sulfuric acid, phosphoric acid and hydrogen sulfide that have lost one or more protons. In organic chemistry and biochemistry, important examples include amino acids and derivatives of citric acid.

Although an amphiprotic species must be amphoteric, the converse is not true. For example, a metal oxide such as zinc oxide, ZnO, contains no hydrogen and so cannot donate a proton. Nevertheless, it can act as an acid by reacting with the hydroxide ion, a base:

ZnO + 2 OH^{−} + H_{2}O → [Zn(OH)_{4}]^{2−}

Zinc oxide can also act as a base:

ZnO + 2H^{+} + 5 H_{2}O → [Zn(H_{2}O)_{6}]^{2+}

== Oxides ==
Zinc oxide (ZnO) reacts both with acids and with bases:

- $\ce{ZnO + \overset{acid}{H2SO4} -> ZnSO4 + H2O}$
- $\ce{ZnO + \overset{base}{2 NaOH} + H2O -> Na2[Zn(OH)4]}$

This reactivity can be used to separate different cations, for instance zinc(II), which dissolves in base, from manganese(II), which does not dissolve in base.

Lead oxide (PbO):

- $\ce{PbO + \overset{acid}{2 HCl} -> PbCl2 + H2O}$
- $\ce{PbO + \overset{base}{2 NaOH} + H2O -> Na2[Pb(OH)4]}$

Lead oxide (PbO_{2}):

- $\ce{PbO2 + \overset{acid}{4 HCl} -> PbCl4 + 2H2O}$
- $\ce{PbO2 + \overset{base}{2 NaOH} + 2H2O -> Na2[Pb(OH)6]}$

Aluminium oxide (Al_{2}O_{3}):

- $\ce{Al2O3 + \overset{acid}{6 HCl} -> 2 AlCl3 + 3 H2O}$
- $\ce{Al2O3 + \overset{base}{2 NaOH} + 3 H2O -> 2 Na[Al(OH)4]}$ (hydrated sodium aluminate)

Stannous oxide (SnO):

- $\ce{SnO + \overset{acid}{2 HCl} <=> SnCl2 + H2O}$
- $\ce{SnO + \overset{base}{4 NaOH} + H2O <=> Na4[Sn(OH)6]}$

Stannic oxide (SnO_{2}):

- $\ce{SnO2 + \overset{acid}{4 HCl} <=> SnCl4 + 2H2O}$
- $\ce{SnO2 + \overset{base}{4 NaOH} + 2H2O <=> Na4[Sn(OH)8]}$

Vanadium dioxide (VO_{2}):

- $\ce{VO2 + \overset{acid}{2 HCl} -> VOCl2 + H2O}$
- $\ce{4 VO2 + \overset{base}{2 NaOH} -> Na2V4O9 + H2O}$

Some other elements which form amphoteric oxides are gallium, indium, scandium, titanium, zirconium, chromium, iron, cobalt, copper, silver, gold, germanium, antimony, bismuth, beryllium, and tellurium.

== Hydroxides ==
Aluminium hydroxide is also amphoteric:

- $\ce{Al(OH)3 + \overset{acid}{3 HCl} -> AlCl3 + 3 H2O}$
- $\ce{Al(OH)3 + \overset{base}{NaOH} -> Na[Al(OH)4]}$

Beryllium hydroxide:

- $\ce{Be(OH)2 + \overset{acid}{2 HCl} -> BeCl2 + 2 H2O}$
- $\ce{Be(OH)2 + \overset{base}{2 NaOH} -> Na2[Be(OH)4]}$

Chromium hydroxide:

- $\ce{Cr(OH)3 + \overset{acid}{3 HCl} -> CrCl3 + 3H2O}$
- $\ce{Cr(OH)3 + \overset{base}{NaOH} -> Na[Cr(OH)4]}$

== See also ==
- Ate complex
- Isoelectric point
- Zwitterion
