= Carbonite (ion) =

Identifiers
CAS Number	12709-62-5
3D model (JSmol)	Interactive image
- InChI: InChI=1S/CO2/c2-1-3/q-2 Key: DEXSTXPKYXOQOB-UHFFFAOYSA-N
- SMILES: [C]([O-])[O-]

Properties
Chemical formula	CO^{2−}_{2}
Molar mass	44.009 g·mol^{−1}
Conjugate acid	Bicarbonite

Related compounds
Related compounds	Carbonate; Carbon monoxide; Carbon dioxide; Oxalate; Bicarbonite; Carbonous acid
- Except where otherwise noted, data are given for materials in their standard state (at 25 °C [77 °F], 100 kPa). Infobox references

The carbonite ion is an anion with the chemical formula CO^{2−}_{2}. This divalent anion forms by deprotonation of carbonous acid (C(OH)_{2}). Alkali metal salts of carbonous acid, Li_{2}CO_{2} (lithium carbonite), K_{2}CO_{2} (potassium carbonite), Rb_{2}CO_{2} (rubidium carbonite) and Cs_{2}CO_{2} (caesium carbonite), have been observed at 15 K. The disodium salt has not been directly observed under experimental conditions, suggesting that this is less stable than other alkali carbonites. Due to the lone pair on the carbon atom, salts of the carbonite ion would be protonated to form formate and formic acid, rather than the carbene.

At lower metal concentrations, salts of the monovalent anions CO^{−}_{2} were favored over CO^{2−}_{2}. Carbonite was not detected when sodium was used as the metal. The alkali metal carbonites obtained in the cryogenic experiments decomposed to the corresponding carbonate (with release of carbon monoxide) or oxalate. The carbonite ion is promptly converted to carbonate in the presence of oxygen.

The presence of carbonite ions has been proposed to be relevant to the adsorption of carbon monoxide on calcium oxide and magnesium oxide and on ceria. In the former, it has been suggested that the carbon atom attaches via a coordinate covalent bond to an oxygen atom from the substrate through its free bonds. In these contexts, it appears that the carbonite ion reacts with excess carbon monoxide to form an anion with the ketene structure, O=C=C(−O^{−})_{2}.

Infrared spectroscopy data confirm earlier theoretical studies that the carbonite anion has a bent structure, with the O−C−O angle varying between 120° and 130° depending on the context. The metal atoms interact with both oxygen atoms. However two geometrical arrangements for the lithium and caesium salts were detected, only one of them being symmetrical on the two oxygen atoms.
