= CH2O2 =

The molecular formula CH_{2}O_{2} (molar mass: 46.03 g/mol) may refer to:

- Dihydroxymethylidene
- Dioxirane, an unstable cyclic peroxide
- Formic acid, an organic acid
- Methylenedioxy, a functional group
