= Hydrogen transfer in protic solvents =

Transfer of a proton between identical molecules

Hydrogen transfer in protic solvents describes the tendency for Hydrogen ions to migrate, often spontaneously, creating acids and bases from substances with neutral acidity.

== Autoprotolysis ==
In chemistry, autoprotolysis is a molecular autoionization, a chemical reaction in which a proton is transferred between two identical molecules, one of which acts as a Brønsted acid, releasing a proton that is accepted by the other molecule, which acts as a Brønsted base. Any chemical that contains both acidic hydrogen and lone pairs of electrons to accept H^{+} can undergo autoprotolysis.

For example, water undergoes autoprotolysis in the self-ionization of water reaction.

2 H_{2}O ⇌ OH^{−} + H_{3}O^{+}

For example, ammonia in its purest form may undergo autoprotolysis:

2 NH_{3} ⇌ NH^{−}_{2} + NH^{+}_{4}

Another example is acetic acid:

2 CH_{3}COOH ⇌ CH_{3}COO^{−} + CH_{3}COOH^{+}_{2}

== Lyate and lyonium ions ==
A lyate ion is the anion derived by the deprotonation of a solvent molecule. For example, a hydroxide ion is formed by the deprotonation of water, and methoxide (CH_{3}O^{−}) is the anion formed by the deprotonation of methanol. Its counterpart is a lyonium ion, the cation derived by the protonation of a solvent molecule. For example, a hydronium ion is formed by the protonation of water, and CH_{3}OH^{+}_{2} is the cation formed by the protonation of methanol.

Lyonium and lyate ions, resulting from molecular autoionization, contribute to the molar conductivity of protolytic solvents.

Examples of Lyate and lyonium ions
Lyate ion		Original solvent		Lyonium ion	
name	formula	name	formula	name	formula
Fluoride	F^{−}	Hydrogen fluoride	HF	Fluoronium	H_{2}F^{+}
Hydroxide	OH^{−}	Water	H_{2}O	Hydronium	H_{3}O^{+}
Azanide	NH^{−}_{2}	Ammonia	NH_{3}	Ammonium	NH^{+}_{4}
Methanide	CH^{−}_{3}	Methane	CH_{4}	Methanium	CH^{+}_{5}
Methoxide	CH_{3}O^{−}	Methanol	CH_{3}OH	Methyloxonium	CH_{3}OH^{+}_{2}

== See also ==
- Onium ion, a protonated molecule more generally
- Ion transport number
- Ionic atmosphere
