= Methyloxonium =

Identifiers
CAS Number	95249-70-0
3D model (JSmol)	Interactive image
ChemSpider	11224793
PubChem CID	12660727
- InChI: InChI=1S/CH4O/c1-2/h2H,1H3/p+1 Key: OKKJLVBELUTLKV-UHFFFAOYSA-O
- SMILES: C[OH2+]

Properties
Chemical formula	CH_{5}O^{+}
Molar mass	33.049 g·mol^{−1}

Related compounds
Related compounds	Dimethyloxonium, Trimethyloxonium, Ethyloxonium, Methylammonium
- Except where otherwise noted, data are given for materials in their standard state (at 25 °C [77 °F], 100 kPa). Infobox references

The methyloxonium ion is a protonated methanol molecule. It is a kind of oxonium ion and is the conjugate acid of methanol.

== Formation ==
Methyloxonium is formed when methanol is treated with a superacid which add a proton.

When methanol undergoes autoprotolysis, if forms methyloxonium along with an equal amount of methoxide.

2 CH_{3}OH → CH_{3}OH^{+}_{2} + CH_{3}O^{−}

Dissolving trifluoromethanesulfonic acid in methanol, produces methyloxonium triflate.

Heat of formation ΔH_{f}° at standard conditions is 574.9 kJ/mol.

== Reactions ==
Methyloxonium is unstable in the presence of water as it reacts:

CH_{3}OH^{+}_{2} + H_{2}O → H_{3}O^{+} + CH_{3}OH

Methyloxonium methylates nucleophiles by displacing a hydrogen ion and releasing a water molecule:

CH_{3}OH^{+}_{2} + ArH → CH_{3}Ar + H_{2}O + H^{+}

Between 100 and 300 °C, methanol in superacids forms methyloxonium ions which then methylate themselves and polymerise to yield alkanes, toluene and other aromatic hydrocarbons.

Methyloxonium forms in the interstellar medium, where it can be broken by UV light to form singlet methylene, or it can react with ethylene to form propylene.
