= Carbonite (explosive) =

Carbonite was one of the earliest and most successful coal-mining explosives. It is made from such ingredients as nitroglycerin, wood meal, and some nitrate as that of sodium; also nitrobenzene, sulfur, and diatomaceous earth. Carbonite was invented by Bichel of Schmidt and Bichel.

The term Carbonite can refer to these things:

- least commonly, an early explosive from Schmidt and Bichel made of sulphuretted tar oil, nitrocumene, and sodium nitrate,
- dynamite made to the specific Carbonite recipe and sold by Schmidt and Bichel under that name, or
- an entire class of spin-offs of the original recipe (Arctic Carbonite, Ammonkarbonit, etc.); their common feature is that the percentage of combustible materials (wood meal or flour starch) is so high that most of the carbon in the reaction is bound into carbon monoxide and the temperature of combustion is relatively low. Some safety dynamites are carbonites.
