= Self-ionization of water =

Autoprotolysis or exchange of a proton between two water molecules

The self-ionization of water (also autoionization of water, autoprotolysis of water, autodissociation of water, or simply dissociation of water) is an ionization reaction in pure water or in an aqueous solution, in which a water molecule, H_{2}O, deprotonates (loses the nucleus of one of its hydrogen atoms) to become a hydroxide ion, OH^{−}. The hydrogen nucleus, H^{+}, immediately protonates another water molecule to form a hydronium cation, H_{3}O^{+}. It is an example of autoprotolysis, and exemplifies the amphoteric nature of water.

== History and notation ==
The self-ionization of water was first proposed in 1884 by Svante Arrhenius as part of the theory of ionic dissociation which he proposed to explain the conductivity of electrolytes including water. Arrhenius wrote the self-ionization as $\ce{H2O <=> H+ + OH-}$. At that time, nothing was yet known of atomic structure or subatomic particles, so he had no reason to consider the formation of an $\ce{H+}$ ion from a hydrogen atom on electrolysis as any less likely than, say, the formation of a $\ce{Na+}$ ion from a sodium atom.

In 1923 Johannes Nicolaus Brønsted and Martin Lowry proposed that the self-ionization of water actually involves two water molecules: $\ce{H2O + H2O <=> H3O+ + OH-}$. By this time the electron and the nucleus had been discovered and Rutherford had shown that a nucleus is very much smaller than an atom. This would include a bare ion $\ce{H+}$ which would correspond to a proton with zero electrons. Brønsted and Lowry proposed that this ion does not exist free in solution, but always attaches itself to a water (or other solvent) molecule to form the hydronium ion $\ce{H3O+}$ (or other protonated solvent).

Later spectroscopic evidence has shown that many protons are actually hydrated by more than one water molecule. The most descriptive notation for the hydrated ion is $\ce{H+(aq)}$, where aq (for aqueous) indicates an indefinite or variable number of water molecules. However the notations $\ce{H+}$ and $\ce{H3O+}$ are still also used extensively because of their historical importance. This article mostly represents the hydrated proton as $\ce{H3O+}$, corresponding to hydration by a single water molecule.

== Equilibrium constant ==
Animation of the self-ionization of water

Chemically pure water has an electrical conductivity of 0.055 μS/cm at 25°C. According to the theories of Svante Arrhenius, this must be due to the presence of ions. The ions are produced by the water self-ionization reaction, which applies to pure water and any aqueous solution:

H_{2}O + H_{2}O ⇌ H_{3}O^{+} + OH^{−}

Expressed with chemical activities a, instead of concentrations, the thermodynamic equilibrium constant for the water ionization reaction is:

$$K_{\rm eq} = \frac{a_{\rm{H_3O^+}} \cdot a_{\rm{OH^-}}}{a_{\rm{H_2O}}^2}$$

which is numerically equal to the more traditional thermodynamic equilibrium constant written as:

$$K_{\rm eq} = \frac{a_{\rm{H^+}} \cdot a_{\rm{OH^-}}}{a_{\rm{H_2O}}}$$

under the assumption that the sum of the chemical potentials of H^{+} and H_{3}O^{+} is formally equal to twice the chemical potential of H_{2}O at the same temperature and pressure.

Because most acid–base solutions are typically very dilute, the activity of water is generally approximated as being equal to unity, which allows the ionic product of water to be expressed as:

$$K_{\rm eq} \approx a_{\rm{H_3O^+}} \cdot a_{\rm{OH^-}}$$

In dilute aqueous solutions, the activities of solutes (dissolved species such as ions) are approximately equal to their concentrations. Thus, the ionization constant, dissociation constant, self-ionization constant, water ion-product constant or ionic product of water, symbolized by K_{w}, may be given by:

$$K_{\rm w}=[{\rm{H_3O^+}}][{\rm{OH^-}}]$$

where [H_{3}O^{+}] is the molarity (molar concentration) of hydrogen cation or hydronium ion, and [OH^{−}] is the concentration of hydroxide ion. When the equilibrium constant is written as a product of concentrations (as opposed to activities) it is necessary to make corrections to the value of $K_{\rm w}$ depending on ionic strength and other factors (see below).

At 24.87 °C and zero ionic strength, K_{w} is equal to 1.0×10^{−14}. Note that as with all equilibrium constants, the result is dimensionless because the concentration is in fact a concentration relative to the standard state, which for H^{+} and OH^{−} are both defined to be 1 molal (= 1 mol/kg) when molality is used or 1 molar (= 1 mol/L) when molar concentration is used. For many practical purposes, the molality (mol solute/kg water) and molar (mol solute/L solution) concentrations can be considered as nearly equal at ambient temperature and pressure if the solution density remains close to one (i.e., sufficiently diluted solutions and negligible effect of temperature changes). The main advantage of the molal concentration unit (mol/kg water) is to result in stable and robust concentration values which are independent of the solution density and volume changes (density depending on the water salinity (ionic strength), temperature and pressure); therefore, molality is the preferred unit used in thermodynamic calculations or in precise or less-usual conditions, e.g., for seawater with a density significantly different from that of pure water, or at elevated temperatures, like those prevailing in thermal power plants.

We can also define pK_{w} $\equiv$ −log_{10} K_{w} (which is approximately 14 at 25 °C). This is analogous to the notations pH and pK_{a} for an acid dissociation constant, where the symbol p denotes a cologarithm. The logarithmic form of the equilibrium constant equation is pK_{w} = pH + pOH.

== Dependence on temperature, pressure and ionic strength ==
Temperature dependence of the water ionization constant at 25 MPa

Pressure dependence of the water ionization constant at 25 °C

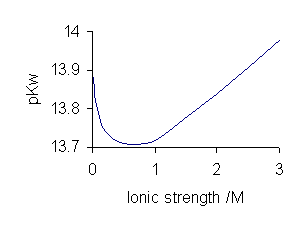
Variation of pK_{w} with ionic strength of NaCl solutions at 25 °C

The dependence of the water ionization on temperature and pressure has been investigated thoroughly. The value of pK_{w} decreases as temperature increases from the melting point of ice to a minimum at c. 250 °C, after which it increases up to the critical point of water c. 374 °C. It decreases with increasing pressure

pK_{w} values for liquid water.
| Temperature | Pressure | pK_{w} |
|---|---|---|
| 0 °C | 0.10 MPa | 14.95 |
| 25 °C | 0.10 MPa | 13.99 |
| 50 °C | 0.10 MPa | 13.26 |
| 75 °C | 0.10 MPa | 12.70 |
| 100 °C | 0.10 MPa | 12.25 |
| 150 °C | 0.47 MPa | 11.64 |
| 200 °C | 1.5 MPa | 11.31 |
| 250 °C | 4.0 MPa | 11.20 |
| 300 °C | 8.7 MPa | 11.34 |
| 350 °C | 17 MPa | 11.92 |

With electrolyte solutions, the value of pK_{w} is dependent on ionic strength of the electrolyte. Values for sodium chloride are typical for a 1:1 electrolyte. With 1:2 electrolytes, MX_{2}, pK_{w} decreases with increasing ionic strength.

The value of K_{w} is usually of interest in the liquid phase. Example values for superheated steam (gas) and supercritical water fluid are given in the table.

Comparison of pK_{w} values for liquid water, superheated steam, and supercritical water.
| Temp. Pressure | 350 °C | 400 °C | 450 °C | 500 °C | 600 °C | 800 °C |
|---|---|---|---|---|---|---|
| 0.1 MPa | | 47.961^{b} | 47.873^{b} | 47.638^{b} | 46.384^{b} | 40.785^{b} |
| 17 MPa | 11.920 (liquid)^{a} | | | | | |
| 25 MPa | 11.551 (liquid)^{c} | 16.566 | 18.135 | 18.758 | 19.425 | 20.113 |
| 100 MPa | 10.600 (liquid)^{c} | 10.744 | 11.005 | 11.381 | 12.296 | 13.544 |
| 1000 MPa | 8.311 (liquid)^{c} | 8.178 | 8.084 | 8.019 | 7.952 | 7.957 |

Notes to the table. The values are for supercritical fluid except those marked: ^{a} at saturation pressure corresponding to 350 °C. ^{b} superheated steam. ^{c} compressed or subcooled liquid.

== Isotope effects ==
Heavy water, D_{2}O, self-ionizes less than normal water, H_{2}O;

D_{2}O + D_{2}O ⇌ D_{3}O^{+} + OD^{−}

This is due to the equilibrium isotope effect, a quantum mechanical effect attributed to oxygen forming a slightly stronger bond to deuterium because the larger mass of deuterium results in a lower zero-point energy.

Expressed with activities a, instead of concentrations, the thermodynamic equilibrium constant for the heavy water ionization reaction is:

$$K_{\rm eq} = \frac{a_{\rm{D_3O^+}} \cdot a_{\rm{OD^-}}}{a_{\rm{D_2O}}^2}$$

Assuming the activity of the D_{2}O to be 1, and assuming that the activities of the D_{3}O^{+} and OD^{−} are closely approximated by their concentrations

$$K_{\rm w}=[{\rm{D_3O^+}}][{\rm{OD^-}}]$$

The following table compares the values of pK_{w} for H_{2}O and D_{2}O.

pK_{w} values for pure water
| T/°C | 10 | 20 | 25 | 30 | 40 | 50 |
| H_{2}O | 14.535 | 14.167 | 13.997 | 13.830 | 13.535 | 13.262 |
| D_{2}O | 15.439 | 15.049 | 14.869 | 14.699 | 14.385 | 14.103 |

=== Ionization equilibria in water–heavy water mixtures ===
In water–heavy water mixtures equilibria several species are involved: H_{2}O, HDO, D_{2}O, H_{3}O^{+}, D_{3}O^{+}, H_{2}DO^{+}, HD_{2}O^{+}, HO^{−}, DO^{−}.

== Mechanism ==
The rate of reaction for the ionization reaction

2 H_{2}O → H_{3}O^{+} + OH^{−}

depends on the activation energy, ΔE^{‡}. According to the Boltzmann distribution the proportion of water molecules that have sufficient energy, due to thermal population, is given by

$$\frac{N}{N_0} = e^{-\frac{\Delta E^\ddagger}{kT}}$$

where k is the Boltzmann constant. Thus some dissociation can occur because sufficient thermal energy is available. The following sequence of events has been proposed on the basis of electric field fluctuations in liquid water. Random fluctuations in molecular motions occasionally (about once every 10 hours per water molecule) produce an electric field strong enough to break an oxygen–hydrogen bond, resulting in a hydroxide (OH^{−}) and hydronium ion (H_{3}O^{+}); the hydrogen nucleus of the hydronium ion travels along water molecules by the Grotthuss mechanism and a change in the hydrogen bond network in the solvent isolates the two ions, which are stabilized by solvation. Within 1 picosecond, however, a second reorganization of the hydrogen bond network allows rapid proton transfer down the electric potential difference and subsequent recombination of the ions. This timescale is consistent with the time it takes for hydrogen bonds to reorientate themselves in water.

The inverse recombination reaction

H_{3}O^{+} + OH^{−} → 2 H_{2}O

is among the fastest chemical reactions known, with a reaction rate constant of 1.3×10^{11} M^{−1} s^{−1} at room temperature. Such a rapid rate is characteristic of a diffusion-controlled reaction, in which the rate is limited by the speed of molecular diffusion.

== Relationship with the neutral point of water ==
Water molecules dissociate into equal amounts of H_{3}O^{+} and OH^{−}, so their concentrations are almost exactly 1.00×10^{−7} mol dm^{−3} at 25 °C and 0.1 MPa. A solution in which the H_{3}O^{+} and OH^{−} concentrations equal each other is considered a neutral solution. In general, the pH of the neutral point is numerically equal to 1/2pK_{w}.

Pure water is neutral, but most water samples contain impurities. If an impurity is an acid or base, this will affect the concentrations of hydronium ion and hydroxide ion. Water samples that are exposed to air will absorb some carbon dioxide to form carbonic acid (H_{2}CO_{3}) and the concentration of H_{3}O^{+} will increase due to the reaction H_{2}CO_{3} + H_{2}O ⇌ HCO_{3}^{−} + H_{3}O^{+}. The concentration of OH^{−} will decrease in such a way that the product [H_{3}O^{+}][OH^{−}] remains constant for fixed temperature and pressure. Thus these water samples will be slightly acidic. If a pH of exactly 7.0 is required, it must be maintained with an appropriate buffer solution.

== See also ==
- Acid–base reaction
- Chemical equilibrium
- Molecular autoionization (of various solvents)
- Standard hydrogen electrode
