= Dihydroxymethylidene =

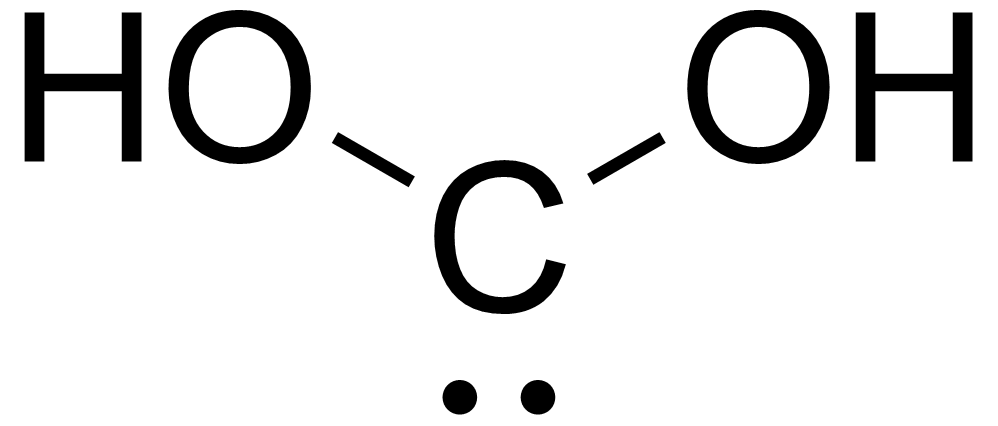
- Structural formula of dihydroxymethylidene

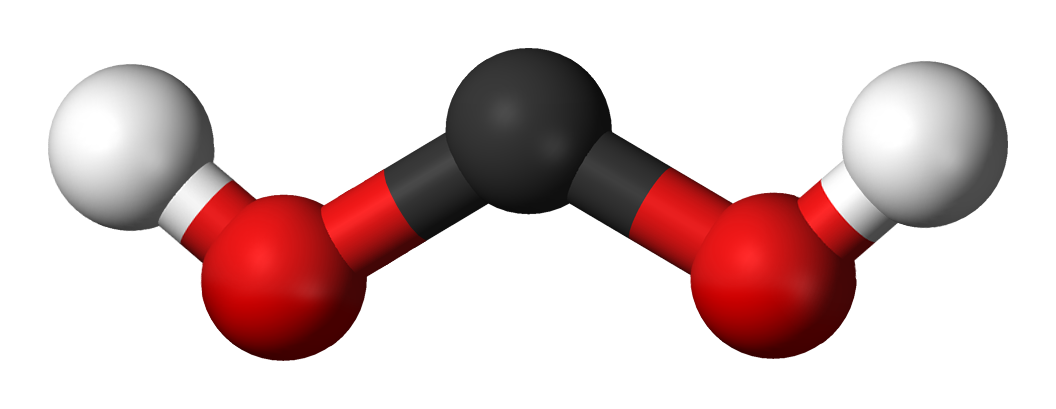
- Ball and stick model of dihydroxymethylidene Ball and stick model of dihydroxymethylidene Carbon, C Hydrogen, H Oxygen, O

Names
- IUPAC name: Carbon(II) hydroxide; Carbon dihydroxide; Carbonous hydroxide
- Preferred IUPAC name Dihydroxymethylidene
- Other names: Carbonic(II) acid; Carbonous acid; Dihydroxycarbene; Dihydroxymethylene; Dihydroxycarbon(2•)

Identifiers
CAS Number	71946-83-3
3D model (JSmol)	Interactive image
ChemSpider	11646598
MeSH	Dihydroxycarbene
PubChem CID	191992
CompTox Dashboard (EPA)	DTXSID70222232
- InChI: InChI=1S/CH2O2/c2-1-3/h2-3H Key: VZOMUUKAVRPMBY-UHFFFAOYSA-N
- SMILES: O[C]O

Properties
Chemical formula	C(OH)_{2}
Molar mass	46.025 g·mol^{−1}

Related compounds
Related compounds	Tin(II) hydroxide; Lead(II) hydroxide; Formic acid; Orthocarbonic acid
- Except where otherwise noted, data are given for materials in their standard state (at 25 °C [77 °F], 100 kPa). Infobox references

Dihydroxymethylidene or carbonous acid is a chemical compound with formula C(OH)_{2}. It is an unstable tautomer of formic acid. There is no evidence that this compound exists in solution, but the molecule has been detected in the gas phase. Many related carbenes are known, although they are often transient.

== Production and properties ==
Dihydroxymethylidene is produced in the gas phase by high vacuum flash vacuum pyrolysis of oxalic acid:

H_{2}C_{2}O_{4} → C(OH)_{2} + CO_{2}

The species is a bent molecule with an O−C−O angle of 105.6° for the C_{2v} all-trans rotamer. Although stable at 10 K, at higher temperatures it isomerizes to formic acid.

The double ionized ion, CO^{2−}_{2}, is known as the carbonite ion.
