= Deprotonation =

Removal of proton(s) from a molecule in an acid-base reaction

Deprotonation of acetic acid by a hydroxide ion

Deprotonation (or dehydronation) is the removal (transfer) of a proton (or hydron, or hydrogen cation), (H^{+}) from a Brønsted–Lowry acid in an acid–base reaction. The species formed is the conjugate base of that acid. The complementary process, when a proton is added (transferred) to a Brønsted–Lowry base, is protonation (or hydronation). The species formed is the conjugate acid of that base.

A species that can either accept or donate a proton is referred to as amphiprotic. An example is the H_{2}O (water) molecule, which can gain a proton to form the hydronium ion, H_{3}O^{+}, or lose a proton, leaving the hydroxide ion, OH^{−}.

The relative ability of a molecule to give up a proton is measured by its pK_{a} value. A low pK_{a} value indicates that the compound is acidic and will easily give up its proton to a base. The pK_{a} of a compound is determined by many aspects, but the most significant is the stability of the conjugate base. This is primarily determined by the ability (or inability) of the conjugated base to stabilize negative charge. One of the most important ways of assessing a conjugate base's ability to distribute negative charge is using resonance. Electron withdrawing groups (which can stabilize the molecule by increasing charge distribution) or electron donating groups (which destabilize by decreasing charge distribution) present on a molecule also determine its pK_{a}. The solvent used can also assist in the stabilization of the negative charge on a conjugated base.

Bases used to deprotonate depend on the pK_{a} of the compound. When the compound is not particularly acidic, and, as such, the molecule does not give up its proton easily, a base stronger than the commonly known hydroxides is required. Hydrides are one of the many types of powerful deprotonating agents. Common hydrides used are sodium hydride and potassium hydride. The hydride forms hydrogen gas with the liberated proton from the other molecule. The hydrogen is dangerous and could ignite with the oxygen in the air, so the chemical procedure should be done in an inert atmosphere, such as nitrogen.

Deprotonation can be an important step in a chemical reaction. Acid–base reactions typically occur faster than any other step, which may determine the product of a reaction. The conjugate base is more electron-rich than the molecule which can alter the reactivity of the molecule. For example, deprotonation of an alcohol forms the negatively charged alkoxide, which is a much stronger nucleophile.

To determine whether or not a given base will be sufficient to deprotonate a specific acid, compare the conjugate base with the original base. A conjugate base is formed when the acid is deprotonated by the base. In the image above, hydroxide acts as a base to deprotonate the carboxylic acid. The conjugate base is the carboxylate salt. In this case, hydroxide is a strong enough base to deprotonate the carboxylic acid because the conjugate base is more stable than the base; it is more stable because the negative charge is delocalized over two electronegative atoms compared to one. Using pK_{a} values, the carboxylic acid is approximately 4 and the conjugate acid, water, is 15.7. Because acids with higher pK_{a} values are less likely to donate their protons, the equilibrium will favor their formation. Therefore, the side of the equation with water will be formed preferentially. If, for example, water, instead of hydroxide, was used to deprotonate the carboxylic acid, the equilibrium would not favor the formation of the carboxylate salt. This is because the conjugate acid, hydronium, has a pK_{a} of -1.74, which is lower than the carboxylic acid. In this case, equilibrium would favor the carboxylic acid.
