= Molecular autoionization =

Chemical reaction between identical molecules to produce ions

In chemistry, molecular autoionization (or self-ionization) is a chemical reaction between molecules of the same substance to produce ions. If a pure liquid partially dissociates into ions, it is said to be self-ionizing. In most cases the oxidation number on all atoms in such a reaction remains unchanged. Such autoionization can be protic (H^{+} transfer), or non-protic.

== Examples ==
=== Protic solvents ===
Protic solvents often undergo some autoionization (in this case autoprotolysis):

- $\ce{2 H2O <=> H3O+ + OH-}$
  - The self-ionization of water is particularly well studied, due to its implications for acid-base chemistry of aqueous solutions.
- $\ce{2 NH3 <=> NH4+ + NH2-}$
- $\ce{2 H2SO4 <=> H3SO4+ + HSO4-}$
- $\ce{3 HF <=> H2F+ + HF2-}$
  - Here proton transfer between two HF combines with homoassociation of F^{−} and a third HF to form HF^{−}_{2}

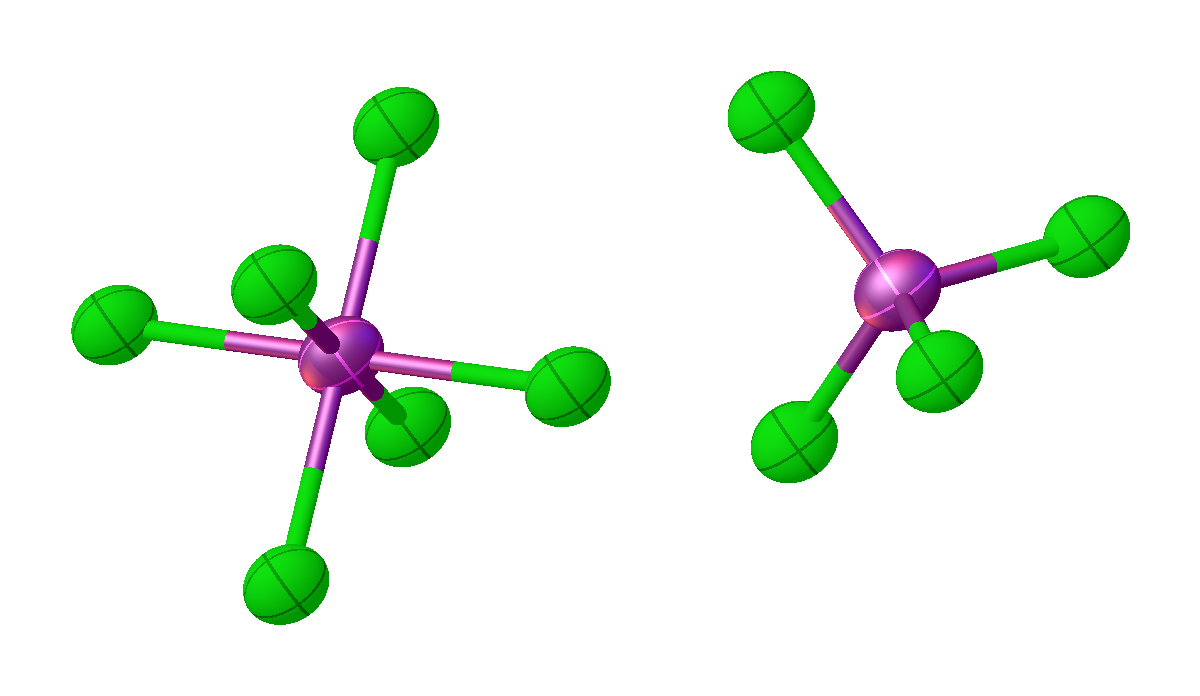
Structure of solid phosphorus pentachloride, illustrating its autoionization into PCl^{+}_{4} and PCl^{−}_{6}.

=== Non-protic solvents ===
- $\ce{2 PF5 <=> PF6- + PF4+}$
- $\ce{N2O4 <=> NO+ + NO3-}$
  - Here the nitrogen oxidation numbers change from (+4 and +4) to (+3 and +5).
- $\ce{2 BrF3 <=> BrF2+ + BrF4-}$

These solvents all possess atoms with odd atomic numbers, either nitrogen or a halogen. Such atoms enable the formation of singly charged, nonradical ions (which must have at least one odd-atomic-number atom), which are the most favorable autoionization products. Protic solvents, mentioned previously, use hydrogen for this role. Autoionization would be much less favorable in solvents such as sulfur dioxide or carbon dioxide, which have only even-atomic-number atoms.

=== Coordination chemistry ===
Autoionization is not restricted to neat liquids or solids. Solutions of metal complexes exhibit this property. For example, compounds of the type FeX_{2}(terpyridine) (where X = Cl or Br) are unstable with respect to autoionization forming [Fe(terpyridine)_{2}]^{2+}[FeX_{4}]^{2−}.

== See also ==
- Ionization
- Ion association
- Solvent system definition of acids and bases
