= Conjugate (acid-base theory) =

Chemical compound formed when an acid donates a proton to a base

A conjugate acid is a chemical compound that is formed when an acid gives a proton (H^{+}) to a base.

A conjugate base is what remains after an acid has donated a proton during a chemical reaction.

In other words, a conjugate acid is a base with a hydrogen ion added to it, as it loses a hydrogen ion in the reverse reaction, and a conjugate base is a substance formed by the removal of a proton from an acid, as it can gain a hydrogen ion in the reverse reaction.

Because some acids can give multiple protons, the conjugate base of an acid may itself be acidic.

In summary, this interaction can be represented as the following chemical reaction:

acid + base ⇌ conjugate base + conjugate acid

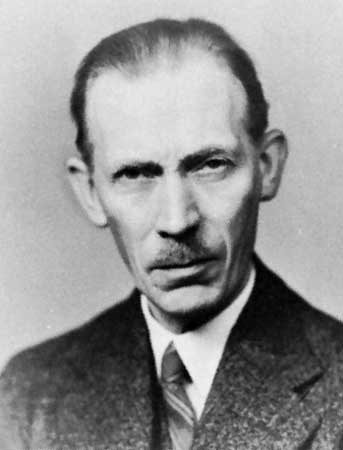
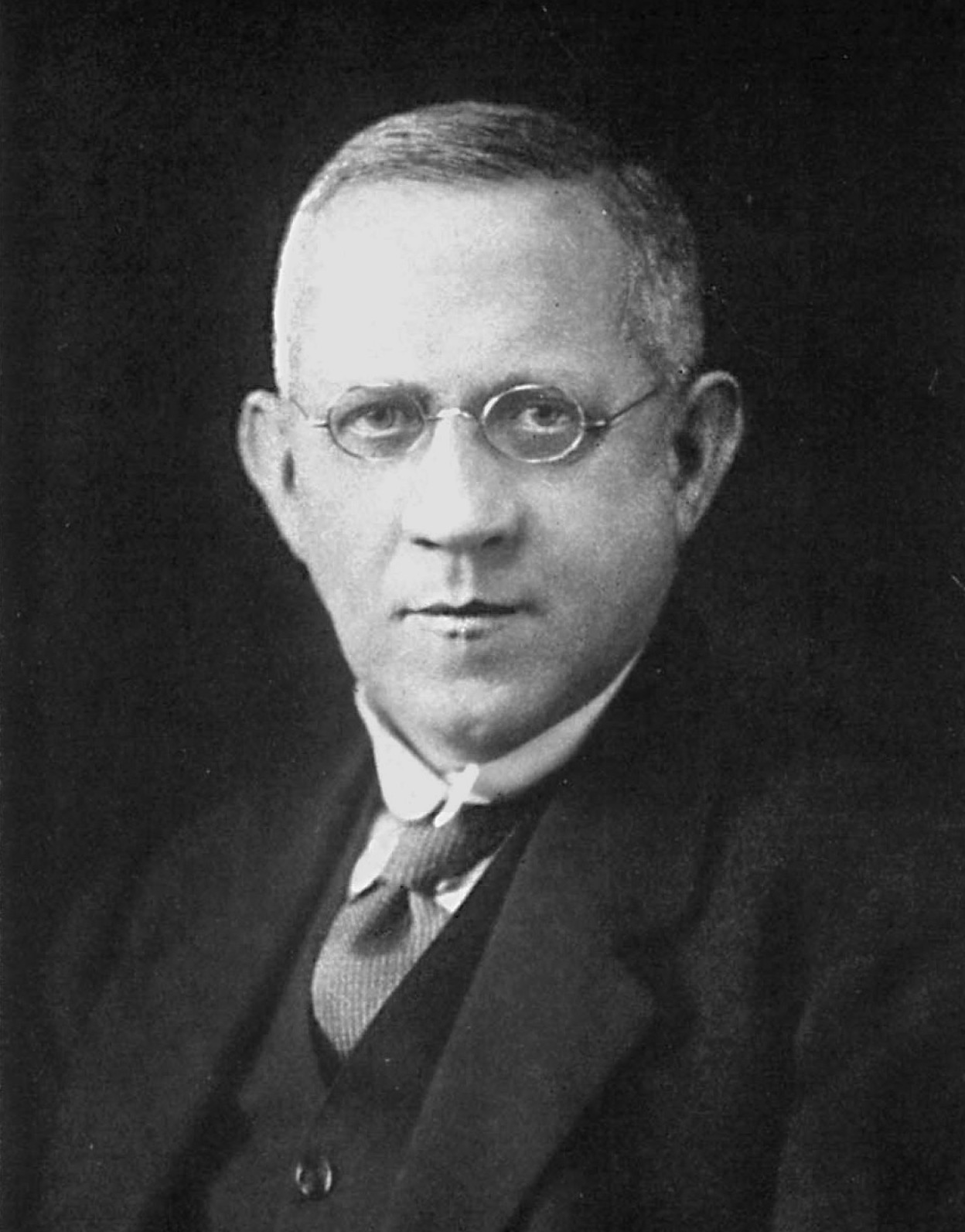
Johannes Nicolaus Brønsted (left) and Martin Lowry (right).

Johannes Nicolaus Brønsted and Martin Lowry introduced the Brønsted–Lowry acid–base theory, which says that any compound that can give a proton to another compound is an acid, and the compound that receives the proton is a base. (A proton is a subatomic particle with a positive electrical charge in the nucleus of an atom. It is represented by the symbol H^{+} because it has the nucleus of a hydrogen atom, that is, a hydrogen cation.)

A cation can be a conjugate acid, and an anion can be a conjugate base, depending on which substance is involved and which acid–base theory is used. The simplest anion which can be a conjugate base is the free electron in a solution whose conjugate acid is the atomic hydrogen.

== Acid–base reactions ==
In an acid–base reaction, an acid and a base react to form a conjugate base and a conjugate acid respectively. The acid loses a proton and the base gains a proton. In diagrams which indicate this, the new bond formed between the base and the proton is shown by an arrow that starts on an electron pair from the base and ends at the hydrogen ion (proton) that will be transferred:

In this case, the water molecule is the conjugate acid of the basic hydroxide ion after the latter received the hydrogen ion from ammonium. On the other hand, ammonia is the conjugate base for the acidic ammonium after ammonium has donated a hydrogen ion to produce the water molecule. Also, OH^{−} can be considered as the conjugate base of H_{2}O, since the water molecule donates a proton to give NH_{4}^{+} in the reverse reaction. The terms "acid", "base", "conjugate acid", and "conjugate base" are not fixed for a certain chemical substance but can be swapped if the reaction taking place is reversed.

== Strength of conjugates ==
The strength of a conjugate acid is proportional to its splitting constant. A stronger conjugate acid will split more easily into its products, "push" hydrogen protons away and have a higher equilibrium constant. The strength of a conjugate base can be seen as its tendency to "pull" hydrogen protons towards itself. If a conjugate base is classified as strong, it will "hold on" to the hydrogen proton when dissolved and its acid will not split.

If a chemical is a strong acid, its conjugate base will be weak. An example of this case would be the splitting of hydrochloric acid HCl in water. Since HCl is a strong acid (it splits up to a large extent), its conjugate base (Cl^{−}) will be weak. Therefore, in this system, most H^{+} will be hydronium ions H_{3}O^{+} instead of attached to Cl^{−} anions and the conjugate bases will be weaker than water molecules.

On the other hand, if a chemical is a weak acid its conjugate base will not necessarily be strong. Consider that ethanoate, the conjugate base of ethanoic acid, has a base splitting constant (K_{b}) of about 5.6×10^{−10}, making it a weak base. In order for a species to have a strong conjugate base it has to be a very weak acid, like water.

== Identifying conjugate acid–base pairs ==
To identify the conjugate acid, look for the pair of compounds that are related. The acid–base reaction can be viewed in a before and after sense. The before is the reactant side of the equation, the after is the product side of the equation. The conjugate acid in the after side of an equation gains a hydrogen ion, so in the before side of the equation the compound that has one less hydrogen ion of the conjugate acid is the base. The conjugate base in the after side of the equation lost a hydrogen ion, so in the before side of the equation, the compound that has one more hydrogen ion of the conjugate base is the acid.

Consider the following acid–base reaction:

HNO_{3} + H_{2}O ⇌ H_{3}O^{+} + NO_{3}^{−}

Nitric acid (HNO_{3}) is an acid because it donates a proton to the water molecule and its conjugate base is nitrate (NO_{3}^{−}). The water molecule acts as a base because it receives the hydrogen cation (proton) and its conjugate acid is the hydronium ion (H_{3}O^{+}).

Equation	Acid	Base	Conjugate base	Conjugate acid
HClO_{2} + H_{2}O ⇌ ClO_{2}^{−} + H_{3}O^{+}	HClO_{2}	H_{2}O	ClO_{2}^{−}	H_{3}O^{+}
H_{2}O + ClO^{−} ⇌ OH^{−} + HClO	H_{2}O	ClO^{−}	OH^{−}	HClO
HCl + H_{2}PO_{4}^{−} ⇌ Cl^{−} + H_{3}PO_{4}	HCl	H_{2}PO_{4}^{−}	Cl^{−}	H_{3}PO_{4}

== Applications ==
One use of conjugate acids and bases lies in buffering systems, which include a buffer solution. In a buffer, a weak acid and its conjugate base (in the form of a salt), or a weak base and its conjugate acid, are used in order to limit the pH change during a titration process. Buffers have both organic and non-organic chemical applications. For example, besides buffers being used in lab processes, human blood acts as a buffer to maintain pH. The most important buffer in our bloodstream is the carbonic acid-bicarbonate buffer, which prevents drastic pH changes when CO_{2} is introduced. This functions as such:

CO_{2} + H_{2}O ⇌ H_{2}CO_{3} ⇌ HCO_{3}^{−} + H^{+}

Furthermore, here is a table of common buffers.

Buffering agent	pK_{a}	Useful pH range
Citric acid	3.13, 4.76, 6.40	2.1 - 7.4
Acetic acid	4.8	3.8 - 5.8
KH_{2}PO_{4}	7.2	6.2 - 8.2
CHES	9.3	8.3–10.3
Borate	9.24	8.25 - 10.25

A second common application with an organic compound would be the production of a buffer with acetic acid. If acetic acid, a weak acid with the formula CH_{3}COOH, was made into a buffer solution, it would need to be combined with its conjugate base CH_{3}COO^{−} in the form of a salt. The resulting mixture is called an acetate buffer, consisting of aqueous CH_{3}COOH and aqueous CH_{3}COONa. Acetic acid, along with many other weak acids, serve as useful components of buffers in different lab settings, each useful within their own pH range.

Ringer's lactate solution is an example where the conjugate base of an organic acid, lactic acid, CH_{3}CH(OH)CO_{2}^{−} is combined with sodium, calcium and potassium cations and chloride anions in distilled water which together form a fluid which is isotonic in relation to human blood and is used for fluid resuscitation after blood loss due to trauma, surgery, or a burn injury.

== Table of acids and their conjugate bases ==
Below are several examples of acids and their corresponding conjugate bases; note how they differ by just one proton (H^{+} ion). Acid strength decreases and conjugate base strength increases down the table.

Acid	Conjugate base
H_{2}F^{+} Fluoronium ion	HF Hydrogen fluoride
HCl Hydrochloric acid	Cl^{−} Chloride ion
H_{2}SO_{4} Sulfuric acid	HSO_{4}^{−} Hydrogen sulfate ion (bisulfate ion)
HNO_{3} Nitric acid	NO_{3}^{−} Nitrate ion
H_{3}O^{+} Hydronium ion	H_{2}O Water
HSO_{4}^{−} Hydrogen sulfate ion	SO_{4}^{2−} Sulfate ion
H_{3}PO_{4} Phosphoric acid	H_{2}PO_{4}^{−} Dihydrogen phosphate ion
CH_{3}COOH Acetic acid	CH_{3}COO^{−} Acetate ion
HF Hydrofluoric acid	F^{−} Fluoride ion
H_{2}CO_{3} Carbonic acid	HCO_{3}^{−} Hydrogen carbonate ion
H_{2}S Hydrosulfuric acid	HS^{−} Hydrosulfide ion
H_{2}PO_{4}^{−} Dihydrogen phosphate ion	HPO_{4}^{2−} Hydrogen phosphate ion
NH_{4}^{+} Ammonium ion	NH_{3} Ammonia
H_{2}O Water (pH=7)	OH^{−} Hydroxide ion
HCO_{3}^{−} Hydrogencarbonate (bicarbonate) ion	CO_{3}^{2−} Carbonate ion

== Table of bases and their conjugate acids ==
In contrast, here is a table of bases and their conjugate acids. Similarly, base strength decreases and conjugate acid strength increases down the table.

Base	Conjugate acid
C_{2}H_{5}NH_{2} Ethylamine	C_{2}H_{5}NH_{3}^{+} Ethylammonium ion
CH_{3}NH_{2} Methylamine	CH_{3}NH_{3}^{+} Methylammonium ion
NH_{3} Ammonia	NH_{4}^{+} Ammonium ion
C_{5}H_{5}N Pyridine	C_{5}H_{6}N^{+} Pyridinium
C_{6}H_{5}NH_{2} Aniline	C_{6}H_{5}NH_{3}^{+} Phenylammonium ion
C_{6}H_{5}CO_{2}^{−} Benzoate ion	C_{6}H_{5}CO_{2}H Benzoic acid
F^{−} Fluoride ion	HF Hydrogen fluoride
PO_{4}^{3−} Phosphate ion	HPO_{4}^{2−} Hydrogen phosphate ion
OH^{−} Hydroxide ion	H_{2}O Water (neutral, pH 7)
HCO_{3}^{−} Bicarbonate	H_{2}CO_{3} Carbonic acid
CO_{3}^{2−} Carbonate ion	HCO_{3}^{−} Bicarbonate
Br^{−} Bromide ion	HBr Hydrogen bromide
HPO_{4}^{2−} Hydrogen phosphate	H_{2}PO_{4}^{−} Dihydrogen phosphate ion
Cl^{−} Chloride ion	HCl Hydrogen chloride
H_{2}O Water	H_{3}O^{+} Hydronium ion
NO_{2}^{−} Nitrite ion	HNO_{2} Nitrous acid

== See also ==
- Buffer solution
- Deprotonation
- Protonation
- Salt (chemistry)
- Carboxylate
