= Professor of Physical Chemistry (Cambridge) =

Academic title at the University of Cambridge

The Professorship of Physical Chemistry is a permanently-established professorship at the University of Cambridge, created in 1920.For the first six decades of its existence, the incumbent was also Head of the Department of Physical Chemistry – a separate entity from the then Department of Chemistry, albeit latterly occupying the same building in Lensfield Road. Following the merger of these two departments in the early 1980s, holders of this Chair have often served as head of the current unified Department of Chemistry.

Occupants of the chair to date have been:

1. Martin Lowry (1920–1936),
  proposed the Brønsted–Lowry acid–base theory
2. Ronald G. W. Norrish (1937–1965),
  Nobel laureate in Chemistry (1967), developed the Norrish reaction
3. Jack Linnett (1965-1975),
  Master of Sidney Sussex College (1970–1975) Vice-Chancellor (1973–1975), proposed the Linnett double-quartet theory
4. John Meurig Thomas (1978–1987),
  Master of Peterhouse (1993–2002), Royal Medallist (2016), a founder of solid-state chemistry
5. Sir David King (1988–2006),
  Master of Downing College (1995–2000), Government Chief Scientific Adviser (2000–2008), chair of Independent SAGE (2020–)
6. John Pyle (2007–2018),
  Davy Medallist (2018), co-chair of the scientific assessment panel for the Montreal Protocol
7. Tuomas Knowles (2023–),
  Corday-Morgan Prize recipient (awarded in 2017)

In addition to the 1920 professorship, the university established a second Professorships of Physical Chemistry for a single tenure (i.e. as personal chair) for Brian Thrush, who held the office from 1978 to 1995.
