= Luxury uptake =

Algae competition for phosphorus

Luxury uptake refers to the adaptation of microalgae sequestering a greater quantity of nutrients, typically phosphorus, than they are immediately able to utilize for growth or metabolic function.

== Description ==
Phosphorus is an essential macronutrient for all algae, as it is both required for growth and a key component of critical biochemical compounds including DNA, RNA, ATP, and phospholipids. While biologically important, phosphorus is often scarce, though sometimes variable, in most habitats and especially in the open ocean. As such, the ability to take up and store phosphorus efficiently is crucial for the fitness and success of algal organisms. Luxury uptake occurs during periods where phosphorus is abundant, allowing for the storage of excess phosphorus as inorganic phosphate, which are packaged into polyphosphates for later use. Typically most algae contain roughly 1% phosphorus by dry weight, however, algae that has engaged in luxury uptake may have heightened concentrations of 4-6% dry weight. The accumulation of excess phosphorus works as a competitive advantage against other microalgae through starving its competitors of phosphorus. There has also been research into the utilization of algae that engages in luxury uptake as a means of phosphorus removal from waste stabilization ponds.

== Kinetics ==
The ability to accumulate phosphorus faster, and therefore in greater quantities, relies on the algae that engage in luxury uptake having a higher affinity towards phosphorus. The inorganic phosphate is taken in by specialized transport proteins embedded within the cell membrane, and are separated into two categories: low-rate high-affinity (preferred when inorganic phosphate is scarce) and high-rate low-affinity transporters (preferred when inorganic phosphate is abundant). In the Donald et al. 1997 experiment, they characterized the high-affinity transporters in both Synechococcus and T. weissflogii and the low-affinity transporters in T. weissflogii. They found that while starved for and then flooded with phosphorus, Synechococcus outcompetes T. weissflogii by having a higher affinity allowing for luxury uptake; however, when replete with phosphorus T. weissflogii performs better over time due to its greater ability to retain phosphorus over time due to its low-affinity transporter.

While phosphorus may be in good supply surrounding the microalgal cell, not all phosphorus is readily bioavailable for uptake. Inorganic phosphate is generally the most bioavailable form of phosphorus, though there are some species of algae, like the pelagic diazotroph Trichodesmium, that are able to scavenge and make use of certain forms of organic phosphate. Types of inorganic phosphates with lower charges (like H_{2}PO_{4}^{-}) are more bioavailable than those with higher charges (such as PO_{4}^{3-}); since these forms of phosphate are dependent on the pH of the cell's surrounding environment, the ability for microalgae to engage in luxury uptake is also dependent on pH. Inorganic phosphate is always favored by the electrochemical gradient to exit the cell, meaning that in order to acquire a net influx of phosphate, the cell must expend energy. The inorganic phosphate packaged into polyphosphates are then stored in vacuoles, cytosol, and chloroplasts. Solovchenko et al. 2019 outlined the kinetics of inorganic phosphate uptake, and therefore luxury uptake, to be predicated upon:

1. The microalgal cell's acclimation to phosphorus abundance/scarcity in the environment.
2. The cell's energetic availability for the conversion of inorganic phosphorus into polyphosphate.
3. The cell's current metabolic need for phosphorus.
