= LDQ =

LDQ or ldq may refer to:

- Liga de Quito, an Ecuadorian professional football club
- Linnett double-quartet theory, a method of describing the bonding in molecules which involves separating the electrons
- Lufu language (ISO 639-3: ldq), a Yukubenic language of Nigeria
