= WAC protein domain =

WAC protein domain, DNA binding

Identifiers
- Symbol: WAC_Acf1_DNA_bd
- Pfam: PF10537
- InterPro: IPR013136
Available protein structures:
- Pfam: structures / ECOD
- PDB: RCSB PDB; PDBe; PDBj
- PDBsum: structure summary

In molecular biology, the WAC domain is a protein domain found on the N-terminus of WSTF protein. Its function is still unknown, but putatively thought to be involved in cell growth. The protein domain has been found to be present in both prokaryotes and eukaryotes

== Function ==
The function of the WAC domain remains to be fully elucidated but it is thought to be part of the process of chromatin assembly, critical for the proper growth and maintenance of cells. ACF (for ATP-utilising chromatin assembly and remodeling factor) is a chromatin-remodeling complex that catalyzes the ATP-dependent assembly of periodic nucleosome arrays. This reaction utilises the energy of ATP hydrolysis by ISWI, the smaller of the two subunits of ACF. Acf1, the large subunit of ACF, is essential for the full activity of the complex.

== Structure ==
The WAC (WSTF/Acf1/cbp146) domain is a 110-amino acid module present at the N-termini of WSTF, Acf1 and cbp146-related proteins in a variety of organisms. It is found in association with other domains such as the bromodomain, the PHD-type zinc finger, DDT or WAKS. The DNA-binding region of Acf1 includes the WAC domain, which is necessary for the efficient binding of ACF complex to DNA. It seems probable that the WAC domain will be involved in DNA binding in other related factors.

== Examples of proteins containing WAC ==
Proteins known to contain a WAC domain are:

- Drosophila melanogaster (Fruit fly) - ATP-dependent chromatin assembly factor large subunit Acf1
- human - WSTF (Williams syndrome transcription factor)
- mouse - cbp146 (alternatively named: Bromodomain adjacent to zinc finger domain protein 1A (Baz1A))
- yeast - imitation switch two complex protein 1 (ITC1 or YGL133w)
- yeast protein - YPL216w
