= Monohydrogen phosphate =

Hydrogen phosphate
- Stereo skeletal formula of hydrogenphosphate

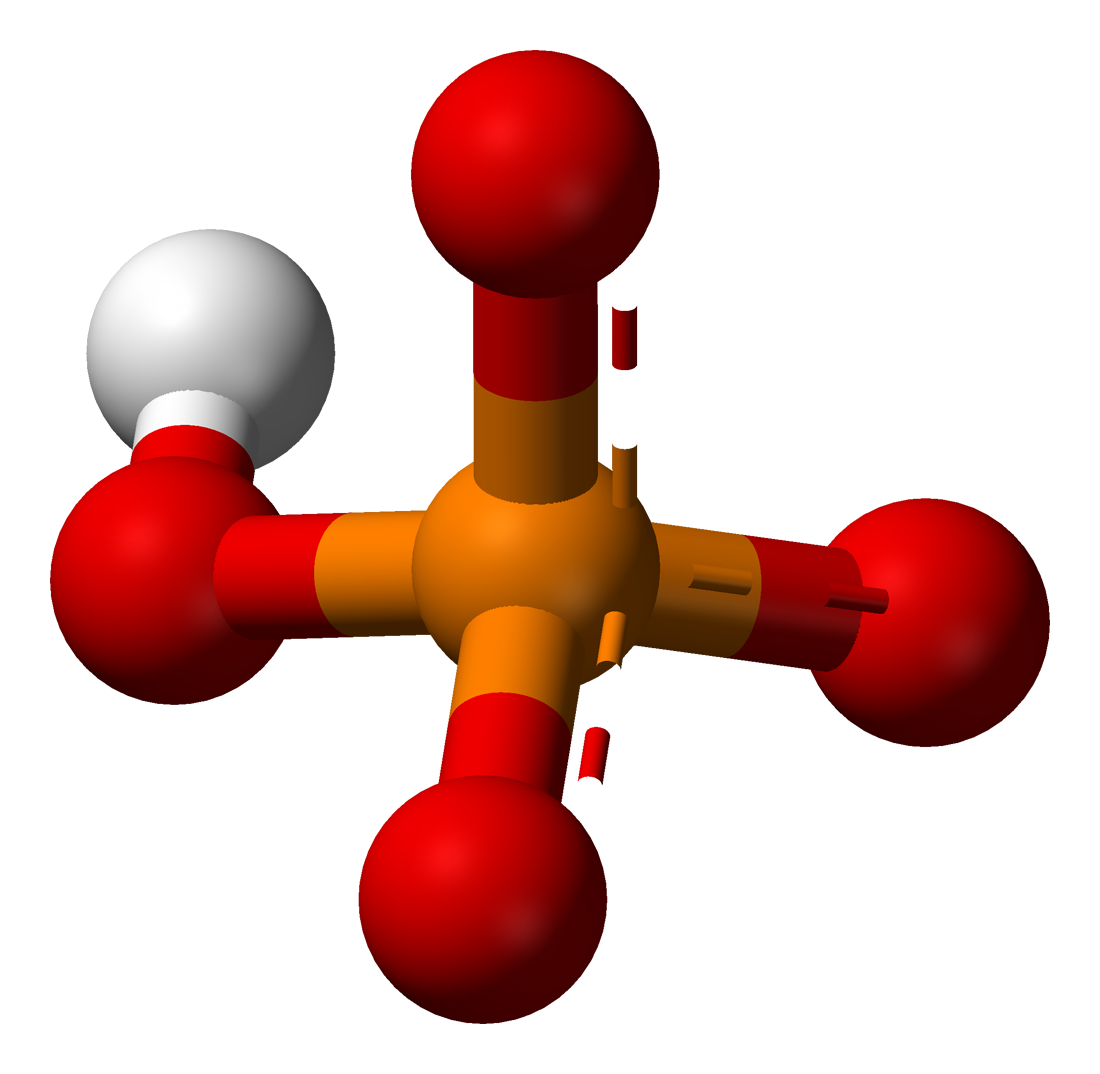
Aromatic ball and stick model of hydrogenphosphate
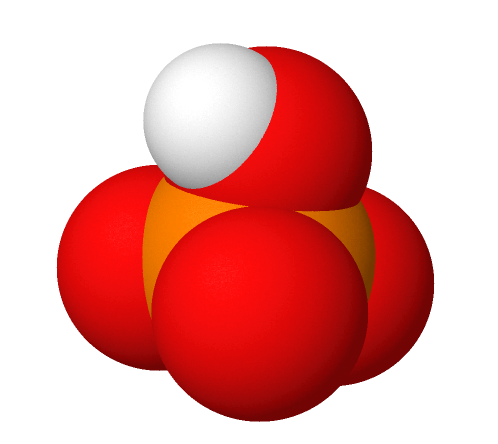
Space-filling model of hydrogenphosphate

Names
- Preferred IUPAC name Hydrogenphosphate
- Systematic IUPAC name Monohydrogenphosphate; Phosphoric acid, ion(2-)
- Other names Phosphoric acid, ion(2-); Hydrophosphoric acid (2-); Biphosphate (2-)

Identifiers
CAS Number	14066-19-4
3D model (JSmol)	Interactive image
ChEBI	CHEBI:43474
ChemSpider	2913859
Gmelin Reference	1998
PubChem CID	3681305
UNII	33UE6C4909
CompTox Dashboard (EPA)	DTXSID10394962
- InChI: InChI=1S/H3O4P/c1-5(2,3)4/h(H3,1,2,3,4)/p-2 Key: NBIIXXVUZAFLBC-UHFFFAOYSA-L
- SMILES: OP(=O)([O-])[O-]

Properties
Chemical formula	HPO^{2−}_{4}
Conjugate acid	Dihydrogen phosphate
Conjugate base	Phosphate
- Except where otherwise noted, data are given for materials in their standard state (at 25 °C [77 °F], 100 kPa). Infobox references

Hydrogen phosphate or monohydrogen phosphate (systematic name) is the inorganic ion with the formula [HPO_{4}]^{2-}. Its formula can also be written as [PO_{3}(OH)]^{2-}. Together with dihydrogen phosphate, hydrogen phosphate occurs widely in natural systems. Their salts are used in fertilizers and in cooking. Most hydrogenphosphate salts are colorless, water soluble, and nontoxic.

It is a conjugate acid of phosphate [PO_{4}]^{3-} and a conjugate base of dihydrogen phosphate [H_{2}PO_{4}]^{−}.

It is formed when a pyrophosphate anion [P_{2}O_{7}]^{4−} reacts with water H_{2}O by hydrolysis, which can give hydrogenphosphate:

[P_{2}O_{7}]^{4−} + H_{2}O ⇌ 2 [HPO_{4}]^{2−}

== Acid-base equilibria ==
Hydrogenphosphate is an intermediate in the multistep conversion of phosphoric acid to phosphate:

Equilibrium	Dissociation constant, pK_{a}
H_{3}PO_{4} ⇌ H_{2}PO^{−}_{4} + H^{+}	pK_{a1} = 2.14 (Note: Values are at 25 °C and 0 ionic strength.)
H_{2}PO^{−}_{4} ⇌ HPO^{2−}_{4} + H^{+}	pK_{a2} = 7.20
HPO^{2−}_{4} ⇌ PO^{3−}_{4} + H^{+}	pK_{a3} = 12.37

== Examples ==
- Diammonium phosphate, (NH_{4})_{2}HPO_{4}
- Disodium phosphate, Na_{2}HPO_{4}, with varying amounts of water of hydration
