= Plant calmodulin-binding domain =

CaM_binding

Identifiers
- Symbol: CaM_binding
- Pfam: PF07839
- InterPro: IPR012417
Available protein structures:
- Pfam: structures / ECOD
- PDB: RCSB PDB; PDBe; PDBj
- PDBsum: structure summary

In molecular biology, the plant calmodulin-binding domain is a protein domain found repeated in a number of plant calmodulin-binding proteins. These domains are thought to constitute the calmodulin-binding domains of these proteins. Binding of the proteins to calmodulin depends on the presence of calcium ions. These proteins are thought to be involved in various processes, such as plant defence responses and stolonisation or tuberization.
