= Kinase binding protein CGI-121 =

CGI-121
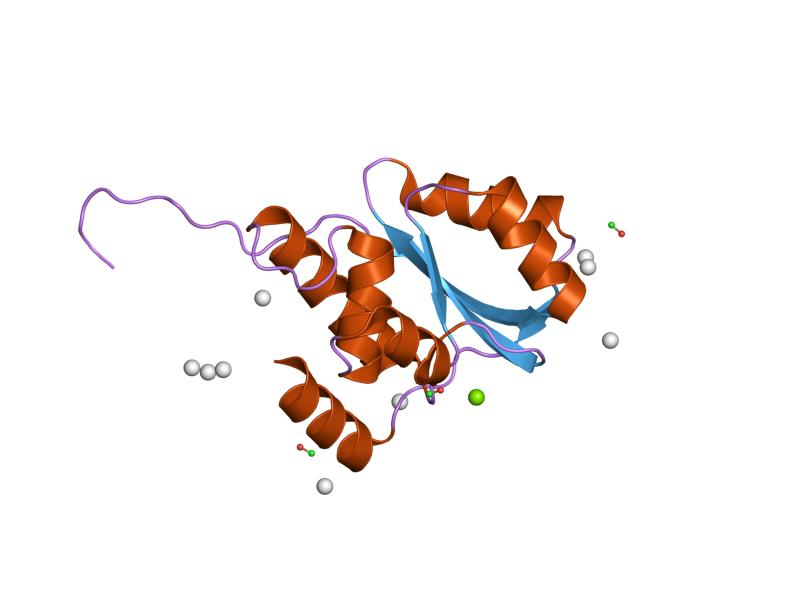
- crystal structure of pfu-542154 conserved hypothetical protein

Identifiers
- Symbol: CGI-121
- Pfam: PF08617
- InterPro: IPR013926
- SCOP2: 1zd0 / SCOPe / SUPFAM
Available protein structures:
- PDB: IPR013926 PF08617 (ECOD; PDBsum)
- AlphaFold: IPR013926; PF08617

In molecular biology, the kinase binding protein CGI-121 family of proteins includes the kinase binding protein CGI-121 and its homologues. CGI-121 has been shown to bind to the p53-related protein kinase (PRPK). CGI-121 is part of a conserved protein complex, KEOPS. The KEOPS complex is involved in telomere uncapping and telomere elongation. This family of proteins also include archaeal homologues.
