= Dihydrogen phosphate =

Inorganic ion

Names
- IUPAC name Dihydrogenphosphate
- Systematic IUPAC name Phosphoric acid, ion(1−)
- Other names Phosphoric acid, ion(1−) Dehydrophosphoric acid (1−)

Identifiers
CAS Number	14066-20-7
3D model (JSmol)	Interactive image
ChEBI	CHEBI:39745
ChemSpider	978
DrugBank	DB02831
Gmelin Reference	1999
PubChem CID	1003
CompTox Dashboard (EPA)	DTXSID40930897
- InChI: InChI=1S/H3O4P/c1-5(2,3)4/h(H3,1,2,3,4)/p-1 Key: NBIIXXVUZAFLBC-UHFFFAOYSA-M
- SMILES: OP(=O)(O)[O-]

Properties
Chemical formula	H_{2}O_{4}P^{−1}
Molar mass	96.986 g·mol^{−1}
Conjugate acid	Phosphoric Acid

Related compounds
Related compounds	Phosphate, Monohydrogen phosphate
- Except where otherwise noted, data are given for materials in their standard state (at 25 °C [77 °F], 100 kPa). Infobox references

Dihydrogen phosphate is an inorganic ion with the formula [H_{2}PO_{4}]^{−}. Phosphates occur widely in natural systems. Perhaps the most common salt of dihydrogen phosphate is sodium dihydrogen phosphate. It is used in animal feed, fertilizer, buffer (in food), and treating metal surfaces.

== Structure ==
The dihydrogen phosphate anion consists of a central phosphorus atom bonded two oxides and two hydroxy groups in a tetrahedral arrangement.

== Acid-base equilibria ==
Dihydrogen phosphate can be both a hydrogen donor and acceptor.

Equilibrium	Disassociation constant, pK_{a}
H_{3}PO_{4} ⇌ H_{2}PO^{−}_{4} + H^{+}	pK_{a1} = 2.14 (Note: Values are at 25 °C and 0 ionic strength.)
H_{2}PO^{−}_{4} ⇌ HPO^{2−}_{4} + H^{+}	pK_{a2} = 7.20
HPO^{2−}_{4} ⇌ PO^{3−}_{4} + H^{+}	pK_{a3} = 12.37

== Examples ==
- Ammonium dihydrogen phosphate ((NH_{4})(H_{2}PO_{4}))
- Monocalcium phosphate (Ca(H_{2}PO_{4})_{2})

== Safety ==
Many foods including milk, eggs, poultry, and nuts contain these sodium phosphates.
