= John A. Pyle =

British atmospheric scientist

John Pyle
- Born: John Adrian Pyle; 4 April 1951 (age 75)
- Education: Durham University (BSc); University of Oxford (PhD)
- Awards: FRS CBE; Davy Medal (2018)
- Scientific career
- Fields: Atmospheric chemistry
- Workplaces: University of Cambridge; University of Oxford; Durham University
- Thesis: Some problems in the numerical modelling of the atmosphere (1977)
- Website: www.ch.cam.ac.uk/person/jap12

John Adrian Pyle CBE FRS is a British atmospheric scientist, Director of the Centre for Atmospheric Science in Cambridge, England. He is a Professor in the Department of Chemistry at the University of Cambridge, and since 2007 has held the 1920 Chair of Physical Chemistry in the Chemistry Department. He is also a Fellow of the Royal Society and of St Catharine's College, Cambridge.

== Education ==
Pyle was educated at De La Salle College, Salford, gained his Bachelor of Science degree in Physics at Durham University and his DPhil from Jesus College, Oxford in 1978.

== Research ==
Pyle is known for his extensive work on atmospheric chemistry and its interactions with climate. His early research was focusing on issues related to stratospheric ozone depletion but in the following decades his work has expanded in a variety of chemistry and climate-related fields.

Pyle was appointed Commander of the Order of the British Empire (CBE) in the 2017 New Year Honours for services to atmospheric chemistry and environmental science.

In 2026, he was awarded the Royal Medal of the Royal Society.
