= Enthalpy–entropy compensation =

Concept in thermodynamics

In thermodynamics, enthalpy–entropy compensation is a specific example of the compensation effect. The compensation effect refers to the behavior of a series of closely related chemical reactions (e.g., reactants in different solvents or reactants differing only in a single substituent), which exhibit a linear relationship between one of the following kinetic or thermodynamic parameters for describing the reactions:

1. Between the logarithm of the pre-exponential factors (or prefactors) and the activation energies
  $$\ln A_i = \alpha + \frac{E_{\text{a},i}}{R\beta}$$
  where the series of closely related reactions are indicated by the index i, A_{i} are the preexponential factors, E_{a,i} are the activation energies, R is the gas constant, and α, β are constants.
2. Between enthalpies and entropies of activation (enthalpy–entropy compensation)
  $$\Delta H^\ddagger_i = \alpha + \beta \Delta S^\ddagger_i$$
  where H^{‡}_{i} are the enthalpies of activation and S^{‡}_{i} are the entropies of activation.
3. Between the enthalpy and entropy changes of a series of similar reactions (enthalpy–entropy compensation)
  $$\Delta H_i = \alpha + \beta \Delta S_i$$
  where H_{i} are the enthalpy changes and S_{i} are the entropy changes.

When the activation energy is varied in the first instance, we may observe a related change in pre-exponential factors. An increase in A tends to compensate for an increase in E_{a,i}, which is why we call this phenomenon a compensation effect. Similarly, for the second and third instances, in accordance with the Gibbs free energy equation, with which we derive the listed equations, ΔH scales proportionately with ΔS. The enthalpy and entropy compensate for each other because of their opposite algebraic signs in the Gibbs equation.

A correlation between enthalpy and entropy has been observed for a wide variety of reactions. The correlation is significant because, for linear free-energy relationships (LFERs) to hold, one of three conditions for the relationship between enthalpy and entropy for a series of reactions must be met, with the most common encountered scenario being that which describes enthalpy–entropy compensation. The empirical relations above were noticed by several investigators beginning in the 1920s, since which the compensatory effects they govern have been identified under different aliases.

== Related terms ==
Many of the more popular terms used in discussing the compensation effect are specific to their field or phenomena. In these contexts, the unambiguous terms are preferred. The misapplication of and frequent crosstalk between fields on this matter has, however, often led to the use of inappropriate terms and a confusing picture. For the purposes of this entry different terms may refer to what may seem to be the same effect, but that either a term is being used as a shorthand (isokinetic and isoequilibrium relationships are different, yet are often grouped together synecdochically as isokinetic relationships for the sake of brevity) or is the correct term in context. This section should aid in resolving any uncertainties. (see Criticism section for more on the variety of terms)

compensation effect/rule : umbrella term for the observed linear relationship between: (i) the logarithm of the preexponential factors and the activation energies, (ii) enthalpies and entropies of activation, or (iii) between the enthalpy and entropy changes of a series of similar reactions.

enthalpy-entropy compensation : the linear relationship between either the enthalpies and entropies of activation or the enthalpy and entropy changes of a series of similar reactions.

isoequilibrium relation (IER), isoequilibrium effect : On a Van 't Hoff plot, there exists a common intersection point describing the thermodynamics of the reactions. At the isoequilibrium temperature β, all the reactions in the series should have the same equilibrium constant (K_{i})
$$\Delta G_i(\beta) = \alpha$$

isokinetic relation (IKR), isokinetic effect : On an Arrhenius plot, there exists a common intersection point describing the kinetics of the reactions. At the isokinetic temperature β, all the reactions in the series should have the same rate constant (k_{i})
$$k_i(\beta) = e^\alpha$$

isoequilibrium temperature : used for thermodynamic LFERs; refers to β in the equations where it possesses dimensions of temperature

isokinetic temperature : used for kinetic LFERs; refers to β in the equations where it possesses dimensions of temperature

kinetic compensation : an increase in the preexponential factors tends to compensate for the increase in activation energy:
$$\ln A = \ln A_0 + \alpha \Delta E_0$$

Meyer–Neldel rule (MNR) : primarily used in materials science and condensed matter physics; the MNR is often stated as the plot of the logarithm of the preexponential factor against activation energy is linear:
$$\sigma(T) = \sigma_0 \exp\left(-\frac{E_\text{a}}{k_{\rm B}T}\right)$$
where ln σ_{0} is the preexponential factor, E_{a} is the activation energy, σ is the conductivity, and k_{B} is the Boltzmann constant, and T is temperature.

== Mathematics ==
=== Enthalpy–entropy compensation as a requirement for LFERs ===
Linear free-energy relationships (LFERs) exist when the relative influence of changing substituents on one reactant is similar to the effect on another reactant, and include linear Hammett plots, Swain–Scott plots, and Brønsted plots. LFERs are not always found to hold, and to see when one can expect them to, we examine the relationship between the free-energy differences for the two reactions under comparison. The extent to which the free energy of the new reaction is changed, via a change in substituent, is proportional to the extent to which the reference reaction was changed by the same substitution. A ratio of the free-energy differences is the reaction quotient or constant Q.
$$(\Delta G'_0 - \Delta G'_x) = Q(\Delta G_0 - \Delta G_x)$$

The above equation may be rewritten as the difference (δ) in free-energy changes (ΔG):
$$\delta \Delta G = Q \delta \Delta G$$

Substituting the Gibbs free-energy equation (ΔG = ΔH – TΔS) into the equation above yields a form that makes clear the requirements for LFERs to hold.
$$(\Delta H' - T\Delta S') = Q(\Delta H - T \Delta S)$$

One should expect LFERs to hold if one of three conditions are met:

1. δΔH's are coincidentally the same for both the new reaction under study and the reference reaction, and the δΔS's are linearly proportional for the two reactions being compared.
2. δΔS's are coincidentally the same for both the new reaction under study and the reference reaction, and the δΔH's are linearly proportional for the two reactions being compared.
3. δΔH's and δΔS's are linearly related to each other for both the reference reaction and the new reaction.

The third condition describes the enthalpy–entropy effect and is the condition most commonly met.

=== Isokinetic and isoequilibrium temperature ===
For most reactions the activation enthalpy and activation entropy are unknown, but, if these parameters have been measured and a linear relationship is found to exist (meaning an LFER was found to hold), the following equation describes the relationship between ΔH^{‡}_{i} and ΔS^{‡}_{i}:
$$\Delta H^\ddagger = \beta \Delta S^\ddagger + \Delta H^\ddagger_0$$

Inserting the Gibbs free-energy equation and combining like terms produces the following equation:
$$\Delta G^\ddagger = \Delta H^\ddagger_0 - (T - \beta)\Delta S^\ddagger$$
where ΔH^{‡}_{0} is constant regardless of substituents and ΔS^{‡} is different for each substituent.

In this form, β has the dimension of temperature and is referred to as the isokinetic (or isoequilibrium) temperature.

Alternately, the isokinetic (or isoequilibrium) temperature may be reached by observing that, if a linear relationship is found, then the difference between the ΔH^{‡}s for any closely related reactants will be related to the difference between ΔS^{‡}'s for the same reactants:
$$\delta \Delta H^\ddagger = \beta \delta \Delta S^\ddagger$$
Using the Gibbs free-energy equation,
$$\delta \Delta G^\ddagger = \left(1 - \frac{T}{\beta}\right) \delta \Delta S^\ddagger$$

In both forms, it is apparent that the difference in Gibbs free-energies of activations (δΔG^{‡}) will be zero when the temperature is at the isokinetic (or isoequilibrium) temperature and hence identical for all members of the reaction set at that temperature.

Beginning with the Arrhenius equation and assuming kinetic compensation (obeying ln A = ln A_{0} + αΔE^{‡}_{0}), the isokinetic temperature may also be given by $k_{\rm B} \beta = \tfrac{1}{\alpha}.$ The reactions will have approximately the same value of their rate constant k at an isokinetic temperature.

== History ==
In a 1925 paper, F.H. Constable described the linear relationship observed for the reaction parameters of the catalytic dehydrogenation of primary alcohols with copper-chromium oxide.

== Phenomenon explained ==
The foundations of the compensation effect are still not fully understood, though many theories have been brought forward. Compensation of Arrhenius processes in solid-state materials and devices can be explained quite generally from the statistical physics of aggregating fundamental excitations from the thermal bath to surmount a barrier whose activation energy is significantly larger than the characteristic energy of the excitations used (e.g., optical phonons). To rationalize the occurrences of enthalpy-entropy compensation in protein folding and enzymatic reactions, a Carnot-cycle model in which a micro-phase transition plays a crucial role was proposed. In drug receptor binding, it has been suggested that enthalpy-entropy compensation arises due to an intrinsic property of hydrogen bonds. A mechanical basis for solvent-induced enthalpy-entropy compensation has been put forward and tested at the dilute gas limit. There is some evidence of enthalpy-entropy compensation in biochemical or metabolic networks, particularly in the context of intermediate-free coupled reactions or processes. However, a single general statistical mechanical explanation applicable to all compensated processes has not yet been developed.

== Criticism ==
Kinetic relations have been observed in many systems and, since their conception, have gone by many terms, among which are the Meyer-Neldel effect or rule, the Barclay-Butler rule, the theta rule, and the Smith-Topley effect. Generally, chemists will talk about the isokinetic relation (IKR), from the importance of the isokinetic (or isoequilibrium) temperature, condensed matter physicists and material scientists use the Meyer-Neldel rule, and biologists will use the compensation effect or rule.

An interesting homework problem appears following Chapter 7: Structure-Reactivity Relationships in Kenneth Connors's textbook Chemical Kinetics: The Study of Reaction Rates:

From the last four digits of the office telephone numbers of the faculty in your department, systematically construct pairs of "rate constants" as two-digit numbers times 10^{−5} s^{−1} at temperatures 300 K and 315 K (obviously the larger rate constant of each pair to be associated with the higher temperature). Make a two-point Arrhenius plot for each faculty member, evaluating ΔH^{‡} and ΔS^{‡}. Examine the plot of ΔH^{‡} against ΔS^{‡} for evidence of an isokinetic relationship.

The existence of any real compensation effect has been widely derided in recent years and attributed to the analysis of interdependent factors and chance. Because the physical roots remain to be fully understood, it has been called into question whether compensation is a truly physical phenomenon or a coincidence due to trivial mathematical connections between parameters. The compensation effect has been criticized in other respects, namely for being the result of random experimental and systematic errors producing the appearance of compensation. The principal complaint lodged states that compensation is an artifact of data from a limited temperature range or from a limited range for the free energies.

In response to the criticisms, investigators have stressed that compensatory phenomena are real, but appropriate and in-depth data analysis is always needed. The F-test has been used to such an aim, and it minimizes the deviations of points constrained to pass through an isokinetic temperature to the deviation of the points from the unconstrained line is achieved by comparing the mean deviations of points. Appropriate statistical tests should be performed as well. W. Linert wrote in a 1983 paper:

There are few topics in chemistry in which so many misunderstandings and controversies have arisen as in connection with the so-called isokinetic relationship (IKR) or compensation law. Up to date, a great many chemists appear to be inclined to dismiss the IKR as being accidental. The crucial problem is that the activation parameters are mutually dependent because of their determination from the experimental data. Therefore, it has been stressed repeatedly, the isokinetic plot (i.e., ΔH^{‡} against ΔS^{‡}) is unfit in principle to substantiate a claim of an isokinetic relationship. At the same time, however, it is a fatal error to dismiss the IKR because of that fallacy.

Common among all defenders is the agreement that stringent criteria for the assignment of true compensation effects must be adhered to.
