= Jack Linnett =

British chemist (1913–1975)

John Wilfrid Linnett
- Born: 3 August 1913; Coventry, England
- Died: 7 November 1975 (aged 62); London, England
- Scientific career
- Fields: Chemist
- Institutions: University of Cambridge; University of Oxford
- Notable students: Keith R. Jennings; Peter Jaffrey Wheatley; Graham Dixon-Lewis; Michael Barber (chemist)

John Wilfrid Linnett (3 August 1913 – 7 November 1975) was Vice-Chancellor at the University of Cambridge from 1973 to 1975. He was for many years a Fellow of the Queen's College, Oxford, and a demonstrator in Inorganic Chemistry at the University of Oxford.

== Education ==
He was born on 3 August 1913 in Coventry in England and educated at King Henry VIII School and St John's College, University of Oxford, and was later a Junior Fellow there.

== Academic career ==
He was appointed Professor of Physical Chemistry at Cambridge University in 1965. He was Master of Sidney Sussex College, Cambridge, on the Council of the Royal Society, and was President of the Faraday Society.

Throughout his career as a chemist, he was noted for his wide interests, making substantial contributions in theoretical chemistry, mass spectrometry, explosion limits, atom recombination reactions, combustion, and several other areas.

== Octet rule ==
In 1960, Linnett originated a modification to the octet rule, originally proposed by Lewis, concerning valence electrons. He proposed that the octet should be considered as a double quartet of electrons rather than as four pairs, and hence the theory became known as "Linnett double-quartet theory". Using this method, he was able to explain the stability of 'odd electron' molecules such as nitric oxide and oxygen. This theory was set out in a book "The Electronic Structure of Molecules: A New Approach", published by Methuen & Co Ltd, London, 1964. His general book "Wave Mechanics and Valency" also published by Methuen & Co Ltd, London, appeared in 1960.

== Death ==
He died of a heart attack in the Athenaeum Club, London, on 7 November 1975, only five weeks after ceasing to be Vice-Chancellor of the University of Cambridge.

The John Wilfrid Linnett Visiting Professor of Chemistry was established in his memory in 1993 at the University of Cambridge.

Academic offices
Preceded by David Thomson	Master of Sidney Sussex College, Cambridge; 1970-1975	Succeeded by Donald Henry Northcote
Preceded by William Alexander Deer	Vice-Chancellor of the University of Cambridge; 1973–1975	Succeeded by Dame Rosemary Murray
