= Graham Dixon-Lewis =

Graham Dixon-Lewis, MA, DPhil, FRS (1 July 1922 – 5 August 2010) was a British combustion engineer.

== Early life and education ==
Dixon-Lewis was born Graham Lewis in Caerleon, Monmouthshire, the first of two children of Daniel Watson Lewis and Eleanor Jane Lewis (nee Anderson). The family name was changed to Dixon-Lewis by deed poll in 1944. He was educated at Newport High School and read chemistry at Jesus College, Oxford, from 1940 to 1944. He earned a DPhil in 1948, and studied with John Wilfrid Linnett.

== Academic career ==
In 1953 Dixon-Lewis joined the Department of Coal Gas and Fuel Industries (later the Department of Fuel and Energy) at the University of Leeds as a research chemist, ultimately being appointed a Reader in 1971 and then to a personal chair in 1978. He retired from the university in 1987 with the title of emeritus professor.

In 1965, Dixon-Lewis was a visiting professor at the Johns Hopkins University in Baltimore, USA. He was a visiting scientist at the Sandia National Laboratories, Livermore, California in 1987 and at the Max Planck Institute, Göttingen, Germany in 1994.

== Honours ==
In 1990 Dixon-Lewis was awarded both the Egerton Gold Medal and the Silver Medal of the Combustion Institute. In 1993, he was the recipient of the Royal Society of Chemistry's Award for Combustion and Hydrocarbon Oxidation Chemistry. Two years later, he was awarded the Dionizy Smolenski Medal of the Combustion Section of the Polish Academy of Sciences. In 1997 he received the Sugden Award of the British Section of the Combustion Institute and in 2008 he was awarded the Huw Edwards Prize of the Institute of Physics for services to combustion physics.

He was elected a Fellow of the Royal Society (FRS) in 1995.

== Marriage and children ==
Dixon-Lewis married Patricia Mary Best in Oxford on 15 April 1950. They had a son and two daughters.

== Death ==
Dixon-Lewis died suddenly at a bus stop in the centre of Leeds on 5 August 2010 at the age of 88. He was survived by his wife and children.
