= Johannes Nicolaus Brønsted =

Danish physical chemist (1879–1947)

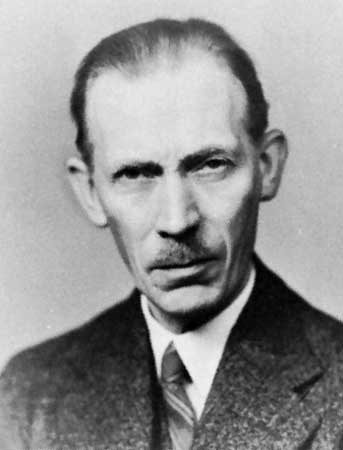
- Portrait of Johannes Brønsted
- Born: 22 February 1879; Varde, Denmark
- Died: 17 December 1947 (aged 68); Copenhagen, Denmark
- Known for: Brønsted–Lowry acid–base theory Brønsted catalysis equation Specific ion interaction theory
- Awards: H. C. Ørsted Medal
- Scientific career
- Fields: Physical chemistry
- Workplaces: University of Copenhagen

Johannes Nicolaus Brønsted (Danish: [joˈhænˀəs ne̝koˈlɛːus ˈpʁɶnsteð]; 22 February 1879 – 17 December 1947) was a Danish physical chemist who is best known for developing the Brønsted–Lowry acid–base theory; he developed the theory at the same time as (but independently of) Martin Lowry.

== Biography ==
Brønsted was born in Varde, Denmark on 22 February 1879. His mother died shortly after his birth, and his father died when Brønsted was 14 years old; he then moved to Copenhagen with his older sister and his stepmother. In 1897, Brønsted began his studies as a chemical engineer at the Polytechnic Institute in Copenhagen. After his first degree, Brønsted changed fields and received his magister degree in chemistry in 1902 from the University of Copenhagen. In 1905, he became an assistant at the Chemical Institute and obtained his doctoral degree in 1908. In the same year, Brønsted became a professor of physical and inorganic chemistry at the University of Copenhagen.

In 1929, Brønsted was a visiting professor at Yale University. His research gained worldwide recognition, resulting in four Nobel Prize nominations, a gold H. C. Ørsted Medal and being appointed as a fellow of the Royal Society and a member of the National Academy of Sciences.

Brønsted married Charlotte Warberg, whom he met during his first degree. The couple had four children. In World War II, Brønsted's opposition to the Nazis led to his election to the Danish parliament in 1947, but he was too ill to take his seat and died shortly after the election.

== Research ==
Early in his career, Brønsted studied chemical thermodynamics and later studied electrolyte solutions and carried out an extensive series of solubility measurements. These measurements led him to establish general laws which were later confirmed when the Debye–Hückel theory was proposed.

Brønsted is best known for his work on reaction kinetics, in particular acid–base reactions. In 1923, he recognized that acid–base reactions involved the transfer of a proton, from the acid (proton donor) to the base (proton acceptor). Almost simultaneously and independently, the British chemist Martin Lowry arrived at the same conclusion, thus the name Brønsted–Lowry acid–base theory. Also in 1923, Gilbert N. Lewis proposed an electronic theory of acid–base reactions, but both theories remain commonly used.

Later in his career, Brønsted kept studying reaction kinetics, with a special focus on reactions taking place in non-aqueous solutions. He also developed some work about the effect of molecular size on the thermodynamical properties of hydrocarbons, polymers and colloids. He also worked with the Nobel prize winner George de Hevesy on isotope separation by fractional distillation.
