= Brønsted catalysis equation =

Scientific law about acid catalysis

The Brønsted catalysis equation or law of correlation, after Johannes Nicolaus Brønsted, gives the relationship between acid strength and catalytic activity in general acid catalysis.

$$\log k = \alpha \cdot \log(K_a) + C$$

A plot of the common logarithm of the reaction rate constant k versus the logarithm of the ionization constant K_{a} for a series of acids (for example a group of substituted phenols or carboxylic acids) gives a straight line with slope α and intercept C. The Brønsted equation is a free-energy relationship. The relationship implies that the Gibbs free energy for proton dissociation is proportional to the activation energy for the catalytic step. When the relationship is not linear, the chosen group of catalysts do not operate through the same reaction mechanism.

Specific and general catalysis is also found in base catalysed reactions and base Brønsted equation also exists with constant β.

The Brønsted equation gives information about a reaction mechanism. Reactions that have low values for proportionality constants α or β are considered to have a transition state closely resembling the reactant with little proton transfer. With a high value, proton transfer in the transition state is almost complete. In a study of a group of phenalene compounds it was concluded from Brønsted analysis that phenalene acidity is very different from either indene acidity or phenylene acidity.

== See also ==
- Free-energy relationship
- Bell–Evans–Polanyi principle
