= Brønsted–Lowry acid–base theory =

Chemical theory about acids and bases

The Brønsted–Lowry theory (also called proton theory of acids and bases) is an acid–base reaction theory, developed independently in 1923 by physical chemists Johannes Nicolaus Brønsted (in Denmark) and Thomas Martin Lowry (in the United Kingdom). The basic concept of this theory is that when an acid and a base react with each other, the acid forms its conjugate base, and the base forms its conjugate acid by exchange of a proton (the hydrogen cation, or H^{+}). This theory generalises the Arrhenius theory.

== Definitions of acids and bases ==
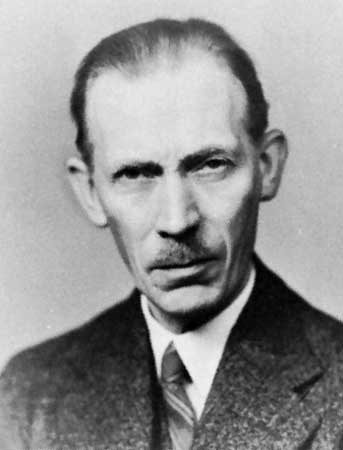
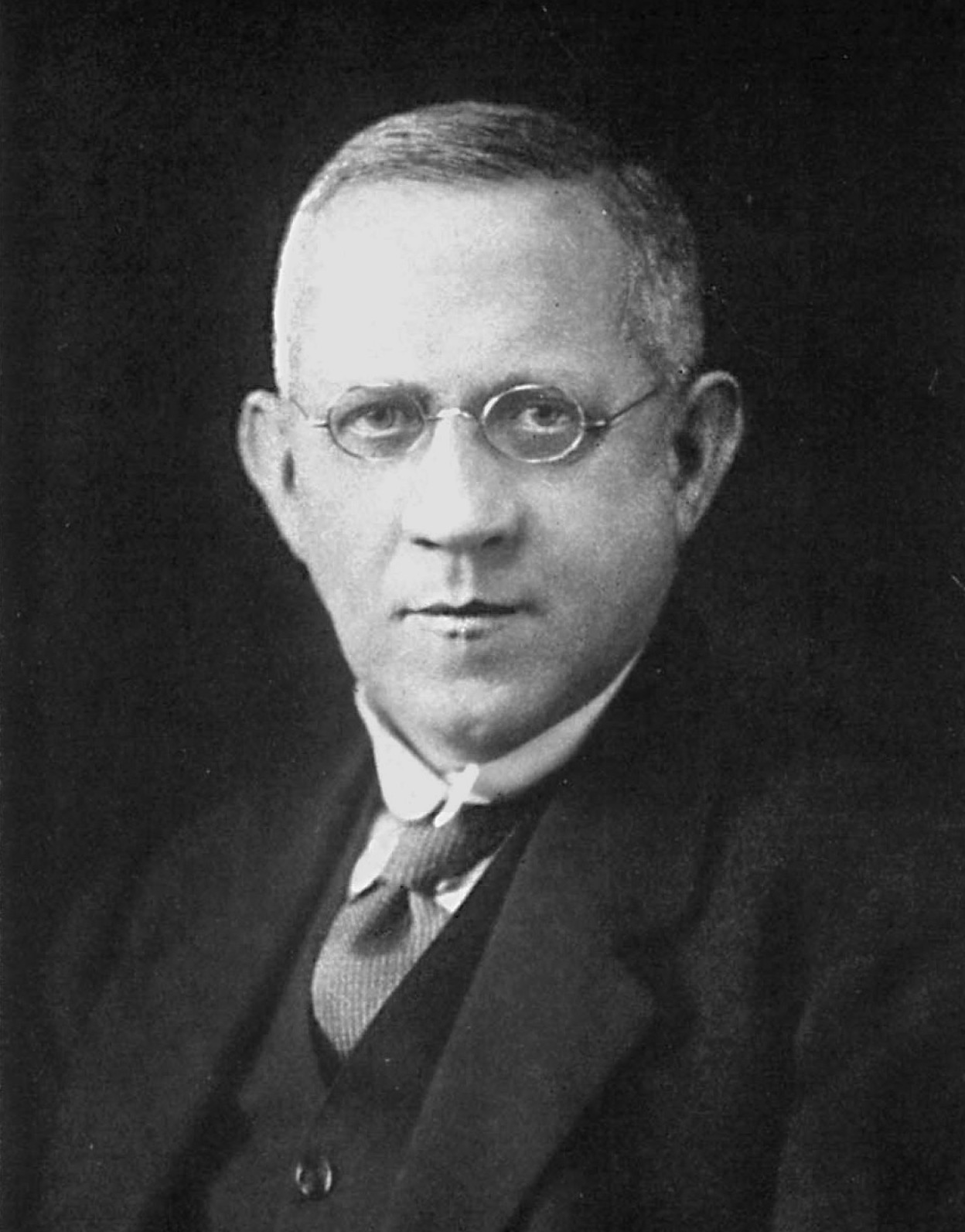
Johannes Nicolaus Brønsted and Thomas Martin Lowry, independently, formulated the idea that acids donate protons (H^{+}) while bases accept protons.

In the Arrhenius theory, acids are defined as substances that dissociate in aqueous solutions to give H^{+} (hydrogen cations or protons), while bases are defined as substances that dissociate or ionize in aqueous solutions to give OH^{−} (hydroxide ions).

In 1923, physical chemists Johannes Nicolaus Brønsted in Denmark and Thomas Martin Lowry in England both independently proposed the theory named after them. In the Brønsted–Lowry theory acids and bases are defined by the way they react with each other, generalising them. This is best illustrated by an equilibrium equation.

acid + base ⇌ conjugate base + conjugate acid.

With an acid, HA, the equation can be written symbolically as:

HA + B ⇌ A^{−} + HB^{+}

The equilibrium sign, ⇌, is used because the reaction can occur in both forward and backward directions (is reversible). The acid, HA, is a proton donor which can lose a proton to become its conjugate base, A^{−}. The base, B, is a proton acceptor which can become its conjugate acid, HB^{+}. Most acid–base reactions are fast, so the substances in the reaction are usually in dynamic equilibrium with each other.

== Aqueous solutions ==
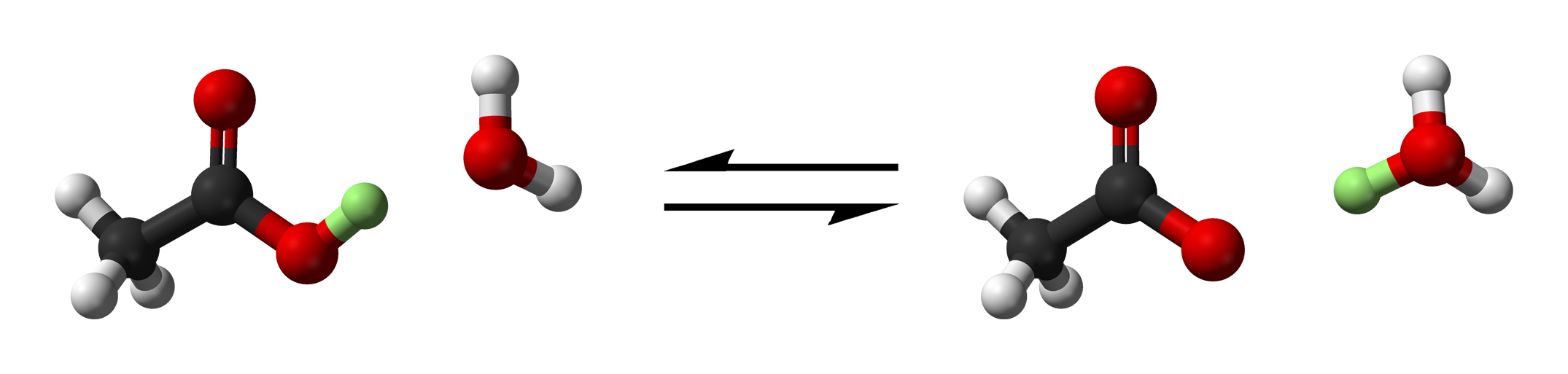
Acetic acid, a weak acid, donates a proton (hydron) to water in an equilibrium reaction to give the acetate ion and the hydronium ion. Oxygen Carbon Hydrogen Proton (hydron)

Consider the following acid–base reaction:

CH_{3}COOH + H_{2}O ⇌ CH_{3}COO^{−} + H_{3}O^{+}

Acetic acid, CH_{3}COOH, is an acid because it donates a proton to water (H_{2}O) and becomes its conjugate base, the acetate ion (CH_{3}COO^{−}). H_{2}O is a base because it accepts a proton from CH_{3}COOH and becomes its conjugate acid, the hydronium ion (H_{3}O^{+}).

The reverse of an acid–base reaction is also an acid–base reaction, between the conjugate acid of the base in the first reaction and the conjugate base of the acid. In the above example, ethanoate is the base of the reverse reaction and hydronium ion is the acid.

H_{3}O^{+} + CH_{3}COO^{−} ⇌ CH_{3}COOH + H_{2}O

One feature of the Brønsted–Lowry theory in contrast to Arrhenius theory is that it does not require an acid to dissociate.

== Amphoteric substances ==
The amphoteric nature of water

The essence of Brønsted–Lowry theory is that an acid is only such in relation to a base, and vice versa. Water is amphoteric as it can act as an acid or as a base. In the image shown at the right one molecule of H_{2}O acts as a base and gains H^{+} to become H_{3}O^{+} while the other acts as an acid and loses H^{+} to become OH^{−}.

Another example is illustrated by substances like aluminium hydroxide, Al(OH)_{3} (also written as Al(OH)_{3}(H_{2}O)_{3}).

+ OH^{−} ⇌ Al(OH)_{4}^{−}
also written as + OH^{−} ⇌ [Al(OH)_{4}(H_{2}O)_{2}]^{−}

+ 3 H^{+} ⇌ Al^{3+} + 3 H_{2}O
also written as + 3 H^{+} ⇌ [Al(H_{2}O)_{6}]^{3+}

=== Non-aqueous solutions ===
The hydrogen ion, or hydronium ion, is a Brønsted–Lowry acid when dissolved in H_{2}O and the hydroxide ion is a base because of the autoionization of water reaction

H_{2}O + H_{2}O ⇌ H_{3}O^{+} + OH^{−}

An analogous reaction occurs in liquid ammonia

NH_{3} + NH_{3} ⇌ NH_{4}^{+} + NH_{2}^{−}

Thus, the ammonium ion, NH_{4}^{+}, in liquid ammonia corresponds to the hydronium ion in water and the amide ion, NH_{2}^{−} in ammonia, to the hydroxide ion in water. Ammonium salts behave as acids, and metal amides behave as bases.

Some non-aqueous solvents can behave as bases, i.e. accept protons, in relation to Brønsted–Lowry acids.

HA + S ⇌ A^{−} + SH^{+}

where S stands for a solvent molecule. The most important of such solvents are dimethylsulfoxide, DMSO, and acetonitrile, CH_{3}CN, as these solvents have been widely used to measure the acid dissociation constants of carbon-containing molecules. Because DMSO accepts protons more strongly than H_{2}O the acid becomes stronger in this solvent than in water. Indeed, many molecules behave as acids in non-aqueous solutions but not in aqueous solutions. An extreme case occurs with carbon acids, where a proton is extracted from a C−H bond.

Some non-aqueous solvents can behave as acids. An acidic solvent will make dissolved substances more basic. For example, the compound CH_{3}COOH is known as acetic acid since it behaves as an acid in water. However, it behaves as a base in liquid hydrogen fluoride, a much more acidic solvent.

CH_{3}COOH + 2 HF ⇌ CH_{3}C(OH)_{2}^{+} + HF_{2}^{−}

== Comparison with Lewis acid–base theory ==
In the same year that Brønsted and Lowry published their theory, G. N. Lewis created an alternative theory of acid–base reactions. The Lewis theory is based on electronic structure. A Lewis base is a compound that can give an electron pair to a Lewis acid, a compound that can accept an electron pair. Lewis's proposal explains the Brønsted–Lowry classification using electronic structure.

HA + B ⇌ A^{−} + BH^{+}

In this representation both the base, B, and the conjugate base, A^{−}, are shown carrying a lone pair of electrons and the proton, which is a Lewis acid, is transferred between them.

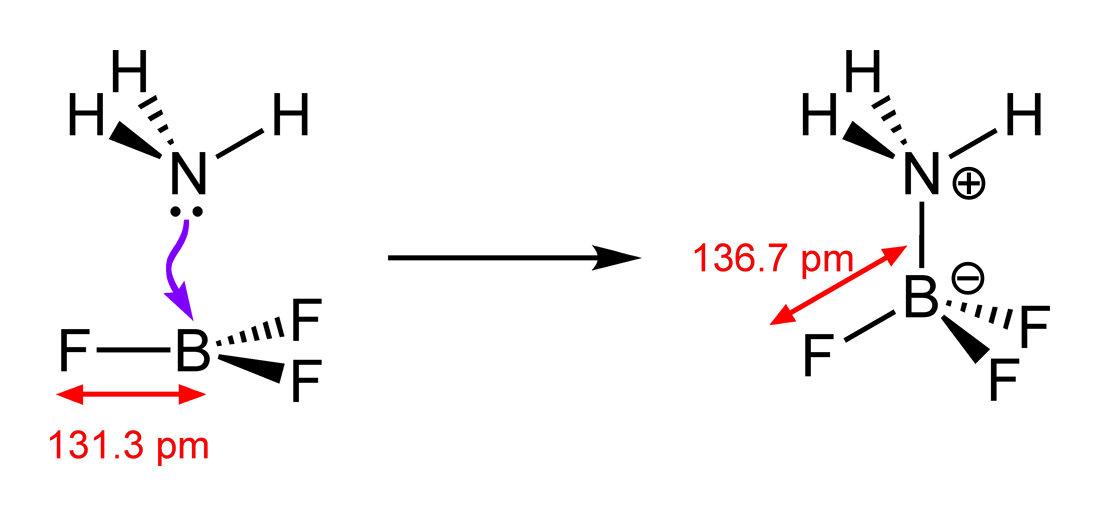
Adduct of ammonia and boron trifluoride

Lewis later wrote "To restrict the group of acids to those substances that contain hydrogen interferes as seriously with the systematic understanding of chemistry as would the restriction of the term oxidizing agent to substances containing oxygen." In Lewis theory an acid, A, and a base, B, form an adduct, AB, where the electron pair forms a dative covalent bond between A and B. This is shown when the adduct H_{3}N−BF_{3} forms from ammonia and boron trifluoride, a reaction that cannot occur in water because boron trifluoride is destroyed by water.

4 BF_{3} + 3 H_{2}O → B(OH)_{3} + 3 HBF_{4}

The reaction above illustrates that BF_{3} is an acid in both Lewis and Brønsted–Lowry classifications and shows that the theories agree with each other.

Boric acid is recognised as a Lewis acid because of the reaction

B(OH)_{3} + H_{2}O ⇌ B(OH)_{4}^{−} + H^{+}

In this case the acid does not split up but the base, H_{2}O, does. A solution of B(OH)_{3} is acidic because hydrogen ions are given off in this reaction.

There is strong evidence that dilute aqueous solutions of ammonia contain minute amounts of the ammonium ion

H_{2}O + NH_{3} ⇌ OH^{−} + NH_{4}^{+}

and that, when dissolved in water, ammonia functions as a Lewis base.

== Comparison with the Lux–Flood theory ==
The reactions between oxides in the solid or liquid states are excluded in the Brønsted–Lowry theory. For example, the reaction

2 MgO + SiO_{2} → 2 Mg + SiO_{4}

is not covered in the Brønsted–Lowry definition of acids and bases. On the other hand, magnesium oxide acts as a base when it reacts with an aqueous solution of an acid (instead, the reaction can be considered a Lewis acid–base reaction).

2 H^{+}(aq) + MgO(s) → Mg^{2+}(aq) + H_{2}O(l)

Dissolved silicon dioxide, SiO_{2}, has been predicted to be a weak acid in the Brønsted–Lowry sense.

SiO_{2}(s) + 2 H_{2}O(l) ⇌ Si(OH)_{4}(aq)
Si(OH)_{4} ⇌ Si(OH)_{3}O^{−} + H^{+}

According to the Lux–Flood theory, oxides like MgO and SiO_{2} in the solid state may be called acids or bases. For example, the mineral olivine may be known as a compound of a basic oxide, MgO, and silicon dioxide, SiO_{2}, as an acidic oxide. This is important in geochemistry.

== Bibliography ==
- Stoker, H. Stephen (2012). General, Organic, and Biological Chemistry. Cengage Learning. ISBN 978-1-133-10394-3.
- Myers, Richard (2003). The Basics of Chemistry. Greenwood Publishing Group. ISBN 978-0-313-31664-7.
- Patrick, Graham (2004). Instant Notes in Organic Chemistry. Taylor & Francis. ISBN 978-1-135-32125-3.
- Srivastava, H. C. (2003). Nootan - ISC Chemistry (7 ed.). India: Nageen Prakashan. ISBN 978-93-80088-89-1.
- Ramakrishna, A. (2014). Goyal's IIT FOUNDATION COURSE CHEMISTRY: For Class-10. Goyal Brothers Prakashan. p. 85. GGKEY:DKWFNS6PECF.
- Masterton, William; Hurley, Cecile; Neth, Edward (2011). Chemistry: Principles and Reactions. Cengage Learning. ISBN 978-1-133-38694-0.
- Whitten, Kenneth; Davis, Raymond; Peck, Larry; Stanley, George (2013). Chemistry. Cengage Learning. ISBN 978-1-133-61066-3.
- Ebbing, Darrell; Gammon, Steven D. (2010). General Chemistry, Enhanced Edition. Cengage Learning. pp. 644–645. ISBN 978-0-538-49752-7.
