= Three-center bond =

In chemistry, there are two types of three-center bonds:

- Three-center two-electron bond, found in electron-deficient compounds such as boranes
- Three-center four-electron bond, found in hypervalent compounds such as the noble gas compounds
