= Martin Lowry =

English physical chemist (1874–1936)

Thomas Martin Lowry CBE, FRS
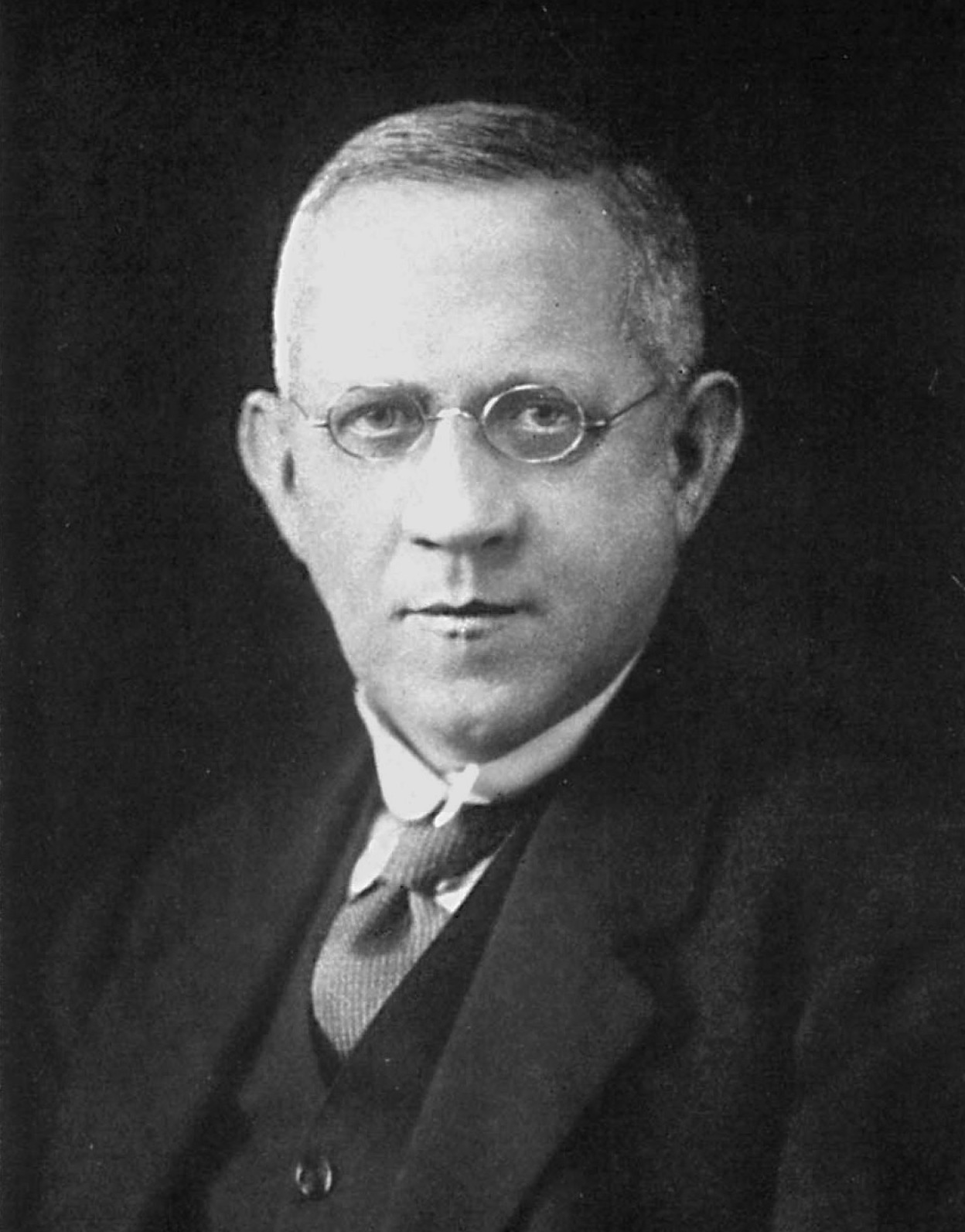
- Lowry, c. 1910
- Born: 26 October 1874; Low Moor, Bradford, England
- Died: 2 November 1936 (aged 62); Cambridge, England
- Known for: Brønsted–Lowry acid–base theory
- Scientific career
- Fields: Physical chemistry
- Doctoral advisor: Henry Edward Armstrong

Thomas Martin Lowry (/ˈlaʊri/; 26 October 1874 – 2 November 1936) was an English physical chemist who developed the Brønsted–Lowry acid–base theory simultaneously with and independently of Johannes Nicolaus Brønsted and was a founder-member and president (1928–1930) of the Faraday Society.

== Biography ==
Lowry was born in Low Moor, Bradford, West Riding of Yorkshire, England, in a Cornish family. He was the second son of the Reverend E. P. Lowry who was the minister of the Wesleyan Church in Aldershot from 1892 to 1919. He was educated at Kingswood School, Bath, Somerset, and then at the Central Technical College in South Kensington. During those years he realized that he wanted to be a chemist. He studied chemistry under Henry Edward Armstrong, an English chemist whose interests were primarily in organic chemistry but also included the nature of ions in aqueous solutions. From 1896 to 1913 Lowry was assistant to Armstrong, and between 1904 and 1913 worked as lecturer in chemistry at the Westminster Training College. In 1913, he was appointed head of the chemical department in Guy’s Hospital Medical and became the first teacher of chemistry in a Medical School to be made a university professor, at the University of London. From 1920 till his death, Lowry served as the Chair of Physical Chemistry at the University of Cambridge. He married a daughter of the Rev. C. Wood in 1904 and was survived by his widow, two sons and a daughter.

Since the establishment of the Faraday Society in 1903, Lowry had been its active member and served as its president between 1928 and 1930. In 1914 he was elected a fellow of the Royal Society. During and after the World War I, Lowry acted as director of shell-filling (1917–1919) and worked for the Trench Warfare Committee, Chemical Warfare Committee and Ordnance Committee. For this service, he was appointed a Commander of the Order of the British Empire and an Officer of the Order of Saints Maurice and Lazarus.

== Research ==
In 1898, Lowry noted the change in optical rotation on nitro-d-camphor with time and invented the term mutarotational to describe this phenomenon. He studied changes in optical rotation caused by acid- and base-catalyzed reactions of camphor derivatives. This led in 1923 to his formulation of the protonic definition of acids and bases, now known as Brønsted–Lowry acid–base theory, independently of the work by Johannes Nicolaus Brønsted. Lowry published a few hundred papers and several books. His 1935 monograph on "Optical Rotatory Power" (1935) has long been regarded as a standard work on the subject.
