= Inorganic ions =

Inorganic ions in animals and plants are ions necessary for vital cellular activity. In body tissues, ions are also known as electrolytes, essential for the electrical activity needed to support muscle contractions and neuron activation. They contribute to osmotic pressure of body fluids as well as performing a number of other important functions. Below is a list of some of the most important ions for living things as well as examples of their functions:

- Ca^{2+} – calcium ions are a component of bones and teeth. They also function as biological messengers, as do most of the ions listed below. (See Hypocalcaemia.)
- Zn^{2+} - zinc ions are found in very small concentrations in the body, and their main purpose is that of an antioxidant; the zinc ions act as antioxidants both generally and for liver specific pro-oxidants. Zinc ions can also act as an antioxidant-like stabilizer for some macro-molecules which bind zinc ions with high affinity, especially in cysteine-rich binding sites. These binding sites use these zinc ions as a stabilizer to protein folds, making these protein motifs more rigid in structure. These structures include zinc fingers, and have several different conformations.
- K^{+} – potassium ions' main function in animals is osmotic balance, particularly in the kidneys. (See Hypokalemia.)
- Na^{+} – sodium ions have a similar role to potassium ions. (See Sodium deficiency.)
- Mn^{2+}- manganese ions are seen being used as stabilizer for varying protein configurations. However, manganese ion overexposure is linked to several neurodegenerative diseases such as Parkinson's disease.
- Mg^{2+} – magnesium ions are a component of chlorophyll. (See Magnesium deficiency (plants))
- Cl^{−} – inability to transport chloride ions in humans manifests itself as cystic fibrosis (CF)
- CO^{2−}_{3} – the shells of sea creatures are calcium carbonate. In blood approximately 85% of carbon dioxide, is converted into aqueous carbonate ions (an acidic solution), allowing a greater rate of transportation.
- Co^{2+}- cobalt ions are present in the human body in amounts from 1 to 2 mg. Cobalt is observed in the heart, liver, kidney, and spleen, and considerably smaller quantities in the pancreas, brain, and serum. Cobalt is a necessary component of vitamin B_{12} and a fundamental coenzyme of cell mitosis. Cobalt is crucial for amino acid formation and some proteins to create myelin sheath in nerve cells. Cobalt also plays a role in creating neurotransmitters, which are vital for proper function within the organism.
- PO^{3−}_{4} – adenosine triphosphate (ATP) is a common molecule which stores energy in an accessible form. Bone is calcium phosphate.
- Fe^{2+}/Fe^{3+} – as found in haemoglobin, the main oxygen carrying molecule has a central iron ion.
- NO^{−}_{3} – source of nitrogen in plants for the synthesis of proteins.

== Biological functions of inorganic ions ==
=== Ion channels ===
==== K^{+} channels ====
Potassium ion channels play a key role in maintaining the membrane's electric potential. These ion channels are present in many various biological systems. They frequently play a role in regulation of cellular level processes, many of these processes including muscle relaxation, hypertension, insulin secretion etc. Some examples of potassium ion channels within biological systems include K_{ATP} channels, BK channels, and ether-a-go-go potassium channels

==== Na^{+} channels ====
Sodium ion channels provide an integral service through the body, as they transmit depolarizing impulses at the cellular and intracellular level. This allows sodium ions to coordinate much more intensive processes such as movement and cognition. Sodium ion channels consist of various subunits, however, only the principle subunit is required for function. These sodium ion channels consist of four internally homologous domains, each of which containing six transmembrane segments and resembling a single subunit of a voltage-dependent potassium ion channel. The four domains fold together, forming a central pore. That central pore of the sodium ions dictates the selectivity of the channel: both ionic radius and ionic charge are key in channel selectivity.

==== Cl^{−} channels ====
Chloride ion channels vary from many other ion channels due to being controlled by the anionic chloride ions. Chloride ion channels are pore-forming membrane proteins that allow the passive transport of chloride ions across biological membranes. Chloride ion channels involve both voltage-gated and ligand-gated mechanisms to transport the ions across cellular membranes. Chloride ion channels have been found to play crucial roles in the development of human diseases, for example, mutations in the genes encoding chloride ion channels lead to a variety of deleterious diseases in muscle, kidney, bone, and brain, including cystic fibrosis, osteoporosis, and epilepsy, and similarly their activation is supposed to be responsible for the progression of glioma in the brain and the growth of malaria-parasite in the red blood cells. Currently, chloride ion channels are not completely understood, and more research is necessary.

== See also ==
- Calcium in biology
- Magnesium in biology
- Inorganic anions in biology
- Phosphate in biology
- Chloride in biology
