= Molecular binding =

Attractive interaction between two molecules

Molecular binding is an attractive interaction between two molecules that results in a stable association in which the molecules are in close proximity to each other. It is formed when atoms or molecules bind together by sharing of electrons. It often, but not always, involves some chemical bonding.

In some cases, the associations can be quite strong—for example, the protein streptavidin and the vitamin biotin have a dissociation constant (reflecting the ratio between bound and free biotin) on the order of 10^{−14}—and so the reactions are effectively irreversible. The result of molecular binding is sometimes the formation of a molecular complex in which the attractive forces holding the components together are generally non-covalent, and thus are normally energetically weaker than covalent bonds.

Molecular binding occurs in biological complexes (e.g., between pairs or sets of proteins, or between a protein and a small molecule ligand it binds) and also in abiologic chemical systems, e.g. as in cases of coordination polymers and coordination networks such as metal-organic frameworks.

== Types ==
Molecular binding can be classified into the following types:

- Non-covalent – no chemical bonds are formed between the two interacting molecules hence the association is fully reversible
- Reversible covalent – a chemical bond is formed, however the free energy difference separating the noncovalently-bonded reactants from bonded product is near equilibrium and the activation barrier is relatively low such that the reverse reaction which cleaves the chemical bond easily occurs
- Irreversible covalent – a chemical bond is formed in which the product is thermodynamically much more stable than the reactants such that the reverse reaction does not take place.

Bound molecules are sometimes called a "molecular complex"—the term generally refers to non-covalent associations. Non-covalent interactions can effectively become irreversible; for example, tight binding inhibitors of enzymes can have kinetics that closely resemble irreversible covalent inhibitors. Among the tightest known protein–protein complexes is that between the enzyme angiogenin and ribonuclease inhibitor; the dissociation constant for the human proteins is 5×10^{−16} mol/L. Another biological example is the binding protein streptavidin, which has extraordinarily high affinity for biotin (vitamin B7/H, dissociation constant, K_{d} ≈10^{−14} mol/L). In such cases, if the reaction conditions change (e.g., the protein moves into an environment where biotin concentrations are very low, or pH or ionic conditions are altered), the reverse reaction can be promoted. For example, the biotin-streptavidin interaction can be broken by incubating the complex in water at 70 °C, without damaging either molecule. An example of change in local concentration causing dissociation can be found in the Bohr effect, which describes the dissociation of ligands from hemoglobin in the lung versus peripheral tissues.

Some protein–protein interactions result in covalent bonding, and some pharmaceuticals are irreversible antagonists that may or may not be covalently bound. Drug discovery has been through periods when drug candidates that bind covalently to their targets are attractive and then are avoided; the success of bortezomib made boron-based covalently binding candidates more attractive in the late 2000s.

== Driving force ==
In order for the complex to be stable, the free energy of complex by definition must be lower than the solvent separated molecules. The binding may be primarily entropy-driven (release of ordered solvent molecules around the isolated molecule that results in a net increase of entropy of the system). When the solvent is water, this is known as the hydrophobic effect. Alternatively, the binding may be enthalpy-driven where non-covalent attractive forces such as electrostatic attraction, hydrogen bonding, and van der Waals / London dispersion forces are primarily responsible for the formation of a stable complex. Complexes that have a strong entropy contribution to formation tend to have weak enthalpy contributions. Conversely complexes that have strong enthalpy component tend to have a weak entropy component. This phenomenon is known as enthalpy-entropy compensation.

== Measurement ==
The strength of binding between the components of molecular complex is measured quantitatively by the binding constant (K_{A}), defined as the ratio of the concentration of the complex divided by the product of the concentrations of the isolated components at equilibrium in molar units:

$$A+B \rightleftharpoons AB:\log K_{A} =\log \left(\frac{[AB]}{[A][B]} \right)=-pK_{A}$$

When the molecular complex prevents the normal functioning of an enzyme, the binding constant is also referred to as inhibition constant (K_{I}).

== Examples ==
Molecules that can participate in molecular binding include proteins, nucleic acids, carbohydrates, lipids, and small organic molecules such as drugs. Hence the types of complexes that form as a result of molecular binding include:

- protein–protein
- protein–DNA
- protein–hormone
- protein–drug

Proteins that form stable complexes with other molecules are often referred to as receptors while their binding partners are called ligands.

== See also ==
- Receptor (biochemistry)
- Supramolecular chemistry
