= RRKM theory =

Microcanonic transition state theory of unimolecular reactions

The Rice–Ramsperger–Kassel–Marcus (RRKM) theory is a theory of chemical reactivity. It was developed by Rice and Ramsperger in 1927 and Kassel in 1928 (RRK theory) and generalized (into the RRKM theory) in 1952 by Marcus who took the transition state theory developed by Eyring in 1935 into account. These methods enable the computation of simple estimates of the unimolecular reaction rates from a few characteristics of the potential energy surface.

== Assumption ==
Assume that the molecule consists of harmonic oscillators, which are connected and can exchange energy with each other.

- Assume the possible excitation energy of the molecule to be E, which enables the reaction to occur.
- The rate of intra-molecular energy distribution is much faster than that of reaction itself.
- As a corollary to the above, the potential energy surface does not have any "bottlenecks" for which certain vibrational modes may be trapped for longer than the average time of the reaction

== Derivation ==
Assume that A^{*} is an excited molecule:

$$A^{*} \xrightarrow{k(E)} A^{\ddagger} \rightarrow P$$

where P stands for product, and A^{‡} for the critical atomic configuration with the maximum energy E_{0} along the reaction coordinate.

The unimolecular rate constant $k_\mathrm{uni}$ is obtained as follows:

$$k_\mathrm{uni} = \frac{1}{h Q_{r} Q_{v}} \int\limits_{E_{0}}^{\infty} \mathrm dE \sum _{J=0} ^{\infty} \frac{(2J+1)G^{\ddagger}(E,J) \exp \!\left(\frac{-E}{k_{b}T}\right)}{1 + \frac{k(E,J)}{\omega}},$$

where $k(E,J)$ is the microcanonical transition state theory rate constant, $G^{\ddagger}$ is the sum of states for the active degrees of freedom in the transition state, $J$ is the quantum number of angular momentum, $\omega$ is the collision frequency between $A^*$ molecule and bath molecules, $Q_r$ and $Q_v$ are the molecular vibrational and external rotational partition functions.

== See also ==
- Transition state theory
