= René Marcelin =

French physical chemist

- Born: 12 June 1885; Gagny, Seine-et-Oise, France
- Died: 24 September 1914 (aged 29); Beaumont-en-Verdunois, France
- Cause of death: Killed in action
- Education: University of Paris
- Scientific career
- Fields: Physics

René Marcelin (12 June 1885 – 24 September 1914) was a French physical chemist, who died in World War I at a young age. He was a pupil of Jean Baptiste Perrin at the Faculty of Sciences in Paris and performed theoretical studies in the field of chemical kinetics.

== Work ==
René Marcelin developed the first theoretical treatment of the rate of chemical reactions that goes beyond a simple empirical description. He showed that the expression of the rate constant given by the Arrhenius equation had to be composed of two terms. In addition to the activation energy term, he considered that there had to be an activation entropy term. In 1910, Rene Marcelin introduced the concept of standard Gibbs energy of activation. In 1912, he treated the progress of a chemical reaction as a motion of a point in phase space. Using Gibbs' statistical-mechanical methods, he obtained an expression similar to the one which he had obtained earlier from thermodynamic consideration. In 1913, René Marcelin was also the first to use the term potential energy surface. He theorized that the progress of a chemical reaction could be described as a point in a potential energy surface with coordinates in atomic momenta and distances.

In his PhD thesis, which he defended in 1914, he developed a general theory on absolute reaction rates, in which he used concepts of both thermodynamic and kinetic origin, describing the activation dependent phenomena as the movement of representative points in space. His 1915 publication, published shortly after his death, describes a chemical reaction between N atomic species in a 2N-dimensional phase space, using statistical mechanics to formally obtain the pre-exponential factor before the exponential term containing the Gibbs free energy of activation. The foundations of his theoretical treatment were correct, but René Marcelin was not able to evaluate the remaining integrals in his expressions, as the solution of these equations was not achievable at that time.

René Marcellin also developed the dividing surface approach to study rates of transport in Hamiltonian systems. These results were published after his death by his brother André in 1918.
