= Potential energy surface =

Function describing the energy of a physical system in terms of certain parameters

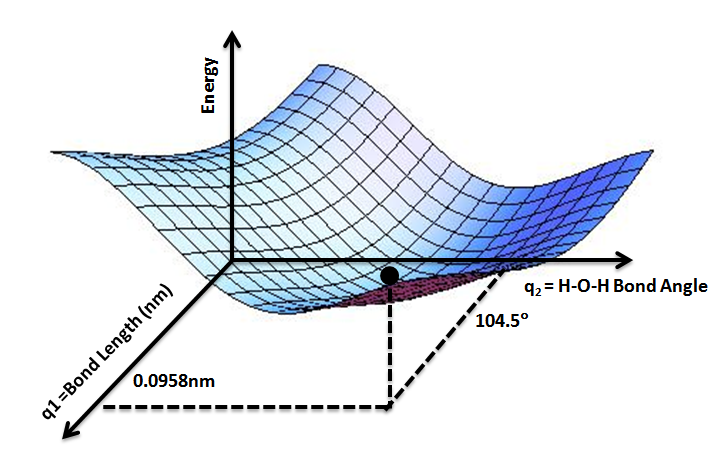
PES for water molecule: Shows the energy minimum corresponding to optimized molecular structure for water – O-H bond length of 0.0958 nm and H-O-H bond angle of 104.5°

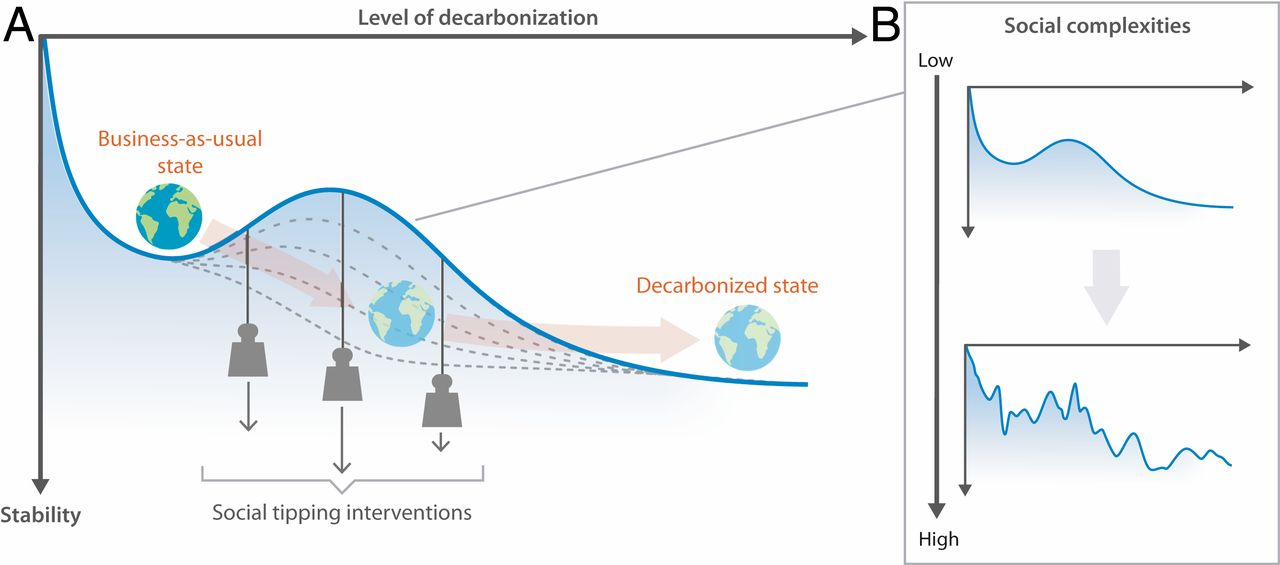
Simplified energy landscape of the world's socioeconomic system and social tipping dynamics at different levels of detail, highlighting factors that influence transitions

A potential energy surface (PES) or energy landscape describes the energy of a system, especially a collection of atoms, in terms of certain parameters, normally the positions of the atoms. The surface might define the energy as a function of one or more coordinates; if there is only one coordinate, the surface is called a potential energy curve or energy profile. An example is the Morse/Long-range potential.

It is helpful to use the analogy of a landscape: for a system with two degrees of freedom (e.g. two bond lengths), the value of the energy (analogy: the height of the land) is a function of two bond lengths (analogy: the coordinates of the position on the ground).

The PES concept finds application in fields such as physics, chemistry and biochemistry, especially in the theoretical sub-branches of these subjects. It can be used to theoretically explore properties of structures composed of atoms, for example, finding the minimum energy shape of a molecule or computing the rates of a chemical reaction. It can be used to describe all possible conformations of a molecular entity, or the spatial positions of interacting molecules in a system, or parameters and their corresponding energy levels, typically Gibbs free energy. Geometrically, the energy landscape is the graph of the energy function across the configuration space of the system. The term is also used more generally in geometric perspectives to mathematical optimization, when the domain of the loss function is the parameter space of some system.

== Mathematical definition and computation ==
The geometry of a set of atoms can be described by a vector, r, whose elements represent the atom positions. The vector r could be the set of the Cartesian coordinates of the atoms, or could also be a set of inter-atomic distances and angles.

Given r, the energy as a function of the positions, E(r), is the value of E(r) for all r of interest. Using the landscape analogy from the introduction, E gives the height on the "energy landscape" so that the concept of a potential energy surface arises.

To study a chemical reaction using the PES as a function of atomic positions, it is necessary to calculate the energy for every atomic arrangement of interest. Methods of calculating the energy of a particular atomic arrangement of atoms are well described in the computational chemistry article, and the emphasis here will be on finding approximations of E(r) to yield fine-grained energy-position information.

For very simple chemical systems or when simplifying approximations are made about inter-atomic interactions, it is sometimes possible to use an analytically derived expression for the energy as a function of the atomic positions. An example is the London-Eyring-Polanyi-Sato potential for the system H + H_{2} as a function of the three H-H distances.

For more complicated systems, calculation of the energy of a particular arrangement of atoms is often too computationally expensive for large scale representations of the surface to be feasible. For these systems a possible approach is to calculate only a reduced set of points on the PES and then use a computationally cheaper interpolation method, for example Shepard interpolation, to fill in the gaps.

== Application ==
A PES is a conceptual tool for aiding the analysis of molecular geometry and chemical reaction dynamics. Once the necessary points are evaluated on a PES, the points can be classified according to the first and second derivatives of the energy with respect to position, which respectively are the gradient and the curvature. Stationary points (or points with a zero gradient) have physical meaning: energy minima correspond to physically stable chemical species and saddle points correspond to transition states, the highest energy point on the reaction coordinate (which is the lowest energy pathway connecting a chemical reactant to a chemical product).

The term is useful when examining protein folding; while a protein can theoretically exist in a nearly infinite number of conformations along its energy landscape, in reality proteins fold (or "relax") into secondary and tertiary structures that possess the lowest possible free energy. The key concept in the energy landscape approach to protein folding is the folding funnel hypothesis.

In catalysis, when designing new catalysts or refining existing ones, energy landscapes are considered to avoid low-energy or high-energy intermediates that could halt the reaction or demand excessive energy to reach the final products.

In glassing models, the local minima of an energy landscape correspond to metastable low temperature states of a thermodynamic system.

In machine learning, artificial neural networks may be analyzed using analogous approaches. For example, a neural network may be able to perfectly fit the training set, corresponding to a global minimum of zero loss, but overfitting the model ("learning the noise" or "memorizing the training set"). Understanding when this happens can be studied using the geometry of the corresponding energy landscape.

== Attractive and repulsive surfaces ==
Potential energy surfaces for chemical reactions can be classified as attractive or repulsive by comparing the extensions of the bond lengths in the activated complex relative to those of the reactants and products. For a reaction of type A + B—C → A—B + C, the bond length extension for the newly formed A—B bond is defined as R*_{AB} = R_{AB} − R^{0}_{AB}, where R_{AB} is the A—B bond length in the transition state and R^{0}_{AB} in the product molecule. Similarly for the bond which is broken in the reaction, R*_{BC} = R_{BC} − R^{0}_{BC}, where R^{0}_{BC} refers to the reactant molecule.

For exothermic reactions, a PES is classified as attractive (or early-downhill) if R*_{AB} > R*_{BC}, so that the transition state is reached while the reactants are approaching each other. After the transition state, the A—B bond length continues to decrease, so that much of the liberated reaction energy is converted into vibrational energy of the A—B bond. An example is the harpoon reaction K + Br_{2} → K—Br + Br, in which the initial long-range attraction of the reactants leads to an activated complex resembling K^{+}•••Br^{−}•••Br. The vibrationally excited populations of product molecules can be detected by infrared chemiluminescence.

In contrast the PES for the reaction H + Cl_{2} → HCl + Cl is repulsive (or late-downhill) because R*_{HCl} < R*_{ClCl} and the transition state is reached when the products are separating. For this reaction in which the atom A (here H) is lighter than B and C, the reaction energy is released primarily as translational kinetic energy of the products. For a reaction such as F + H_{2} → HF + H in which atom A is heavier than B and C, there is mixed energy release, both vibrational and translational, even though the PES is repulsive.

For endothermic reactions, the type of surface determines the type of energy which is most effective in bringing about reaction. Translational energy of the reactants is most effective at inducing reactions with an attractive surface, while vibrational excitation (to higher vibrational quantum number v) is more effective for reactions with a repulsive surface. As an example of the latter case, the reaction F + HCl(v=1) → Cl + HF is about five times faster than F + HCl(v=0) → Cl + HF for the same total energy of HCl.

== History ==
The concept of a potential energy surface for chemical reactions was first suggested by the French physicist René Marcelin in 1913. The first semi-empirical calculation of a potential energy surface was proposed for the H + H_{2} reaction by Henry Eyring and Michael Polanyi in 1931. Eyring used potential energy surfaces to calculate reaction rate constants in the transition state theory in 1935.

== H + H_{2} two-dimensional PES ==
Potential energy surfaces are commonly shown as three-dimensional graphs, but they can also be represented by two-dimensional graphs, in which the advancement of the reaction is plotted by the use of isoenergetic lines. The collinear system H + H_{2} is a simple reaction that allows a two-dimension PES to be plotted in an easy and understandable way. In this reaction, a hydrogen atom (H) reacts with a dihydrogen molecule (H_{2}) by forming a new bond with one atom from the molecule, which in turn breaks the bond of the original molecule. This is symbolized as H_{a} + H_{b}–H_{c} → H_{a}–H_{b} + H_{c}. The progression of the reaction from reactants (H+H₂) to products (H-H-H), as well as the energy of the species that take part in the reaction, are well defined in the corresponding potential energy surface. Energy profiles describe potential energy as a function of geometrical variables (PES in any dimension are independent of time and temperature).

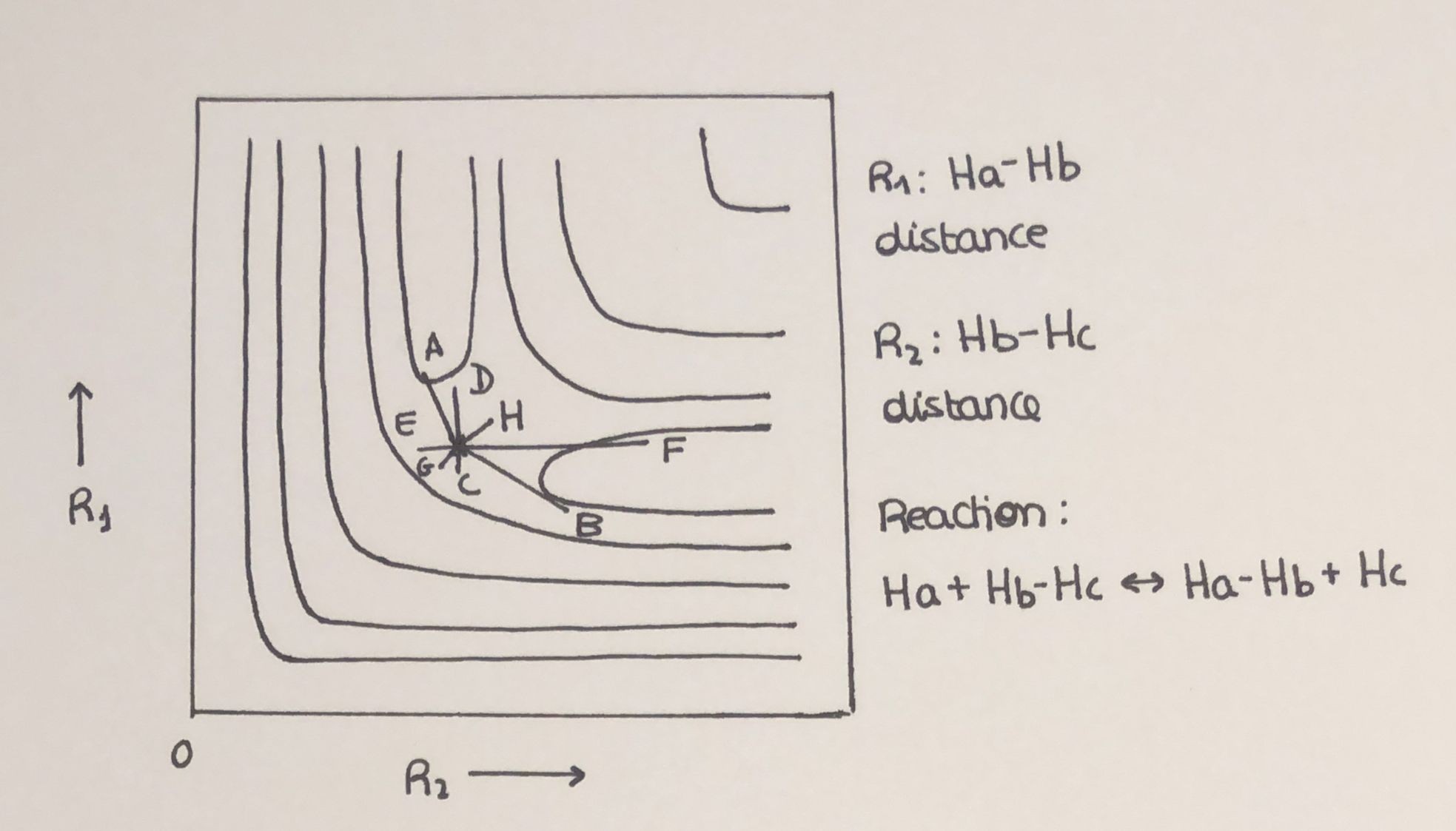
H+H2 Potential energy surface

We have different relevant elements in the 2-D PES:

- The 2-D plot shows the minima points where we find reactants, the products and the saddle point or transition state.
- The transition state is a maximum in the reaction coordinate and a minimum in the coordinate perpendicular to the reaction path.
- The advance of time describes a trajectory in every reaction. Depending on the conditions of the reaction the process will show different ways to get to the product formation plotted between the 2 axes.

== See also ==
- Computational chemistry
- Energy minimization (or geometry optimization)
- Energy profile (chemistry)
- Potential well
- Reaction coordinate

== Bibliographie ==
Schön, J. C. (5 August 2024). "Energy landscapes—Past, present, and future: A perspective". Journal of Chemical Physics. 161 (5) 050901. Bibcode:2024JChPh.161e0901S. doi:10.1063/5.0212867. PMID 39101536.
