= Entropy of activation =

Concept in chemical kinetics

In chemical kinetics, the entropy of activation of a reaction is one of the two parameters (along with the enthalpy of activation) that are typically obtained from the temperature dependence of a reaction rate constant, when these data are analyzed using the Eyring equation of the transition state theory. The standard entropy of activation is symbolized ΔS^{‡} and equals the change in entropy when the reactants change from their initial state to the activated complex or transition state (Δ = change, S = entropy, ‡ = activation).

== Importance ==
Entropy of activation determines the preexponential factor A of the Arrhenius equation for temperature dependence of reaction rates. The relationship depends on the molecularity of the reaction:

- for reactions in solution and unimolecular gas reactions
  A = (ek_{B}T/h) exp(ΔS^{‡}/R),
- while for bimolecular gas reactions
  A = (e^{2}k_{B}T/h) (RT/p) exp(ΔS^{‡}/R).

In these equations e is the base of natural logarithms, h is the Planck constant, k_{B} is the Boltzmann constant and T the absolute temperature. R′ is the ideal gas constant. The factor is needed because of the pressure dependence of the reaction rate. R′ = 8.3145×10^{−2} (bar·L)/(mol·K).

The value of ΔS^{‡} provides clues about the molecularity of the rate determining step in a reaction, i.e. the number of molecules that enter this step. Positive values suggest that entropy increases upon achieving the transition state, which often indicates a dissociative mechanism in which the activated complex is loosely bound and about to dissociate. Negative values for ΔS^{‡} indicate that entropy decreases on forming the transition state, which often indicates an associative mechanism in which two reaction partners form a single activated complex.

== Derivation ==
It is possible to obtain entropy of activation using Eyring equation. This equation is of the form
$$k = \frac{\kappa k_\mathrm{B}T}{h} e^{\frac{\Delta S^\ddagger }{R}} e^{-\frac{\Delta H^\ddagger}{RT}}$$
where:

- $k$ = reaction rate constant
- $T$ = absolute temperature
- $\Delta H^\ddagger$ = enthalpy of activation
- $R$ = gas constant
- $\kappa$ = transmission coefficient
- $k_\mathrm{B}$ = Boltzmann constant = R/N_{A}, N_{A} = Avogadro constant
- $h$ = Planck constant
- $\Delta S^\ddagger$ = entropy of activation

This equation can be turned into the form
$$\ln \frac{k}{T} = \frac{-\Delta H^\ddagger}{R} \cdot \frac{1}{T} + \ln \frac{\kappa k_\mathrm{B}}{h} + \frac{\Delta S^\ddagger}{R}$$
The plot of $\ln(k/T)$ versus $1/T$ gives a straight line with slope $-\Delta H^\ddagger/ R$ from which the enthalpy of activation can be derived and with intercept $\ln(\kappa k_\mathrm{B} / h) + \Delta S^\ddagger/ R$ from which the entropy of activation is derived.
