= Eyring equation =

Chemical kinetics equation

The Eyring equation (occasionally also known as Eyring–Polanyi equation) is an equation used in chemical kinetics to describe changes in the rate of a chemical reaction against temperature. It was developed almost simultaneously in 1935 by Henry Eyring, Meredith Gwynne Evans and Michael Polanyi. The equation follows from the transition state theory, also known as activated-complex theory. If one assumes a constant enthalpy of activation and constant entropy of activation, the Eyring equation is similar to the Arrhenius equation, despite the Arrhenius equation being phenomenological and the Eyring equation based on statistical mechanical justification.

== General form ==
The general form of the Eyring–Polanyi equation somewhat resembles the Arrhenius equation:
$$\ k = \frac{\kappa k_\mathrm{B}T}{h} e^{-\frac{\Delta G^\ddagger }{RT}}$$
where $k$ is the rate constant, $\Delta G^\ddagger$ is the Gibbs energy of activation, $\kappa$ is the transmission coefficient, $k_\mathrm{B}$ is the Boltzmann constant, $T$ is the absolute temperature (Kelvin), and $h$ is the Planck constant.

The transmission coefficient $\kappa$ is often assumed to be equal to one as it reflects what fraction of the flux through the transition state proceeds to the product without recrossing the transition state. So, a transmission coefficient equal to one means that the fundamental no-recrossing assumption of transition state theory holds perfectly. However, $\kappa$ is typically not one because (i) the reaction coordinate chosen for the process at hand is usually not perfect and (ii) many barrier-crossing processes are somewhat or even strongly diffusive in nature. For example, the transmission coefficient of methane hopping in a gas hydrate from one site to an adjacent empty site is between 0.25 and 0.5. Typically, reactive flux correlation function (RFCF) simulations are performed in order to explicitly calculate $\kappa$ from the resulting plateau in the RFCF. This approach is also referred to as the Bennett-Chandler approach, which yields a dynamical correction to the standard transition state theory-based rate constant.

It can be rewritten as:
$$k = \frac{\kappa k_\mathrm{B}T}{h} e^{\frac{\Delta S^\ddagger }{R}} e^{-\frac{\Delta H^\ddagger}{RT}}$$

One can put this equation in the following form:
$$\ln \frac{k}{T} = \frac{-\Delta H^\ddagger}{R} \cdot \frac{1}{T} + \ln \frac{\kappa k_\mathrm{B}}{h} + \frac{\Delta S^\ddagger}{R}$$
where:

- $k$ = reaction rate constant
- $T$ = absolute temperature
- $\Delta H^\ddagger$ = enthalpy of activation
- $R$ = gas constant
- $\kappa$ = transmission coefficient
- $k_\mathrm{B}$ = Boltzmann constant = R/N_{A}, N_{A} = Avogadro constant
- $h$ = Planck constant
- $\Delta S^\ddagger$ = entropy of activation

If one assumes constant enthalpy of activation, constant entropy of activation, and constant transmission coefficient, this equation can be used as follows: A certain chemical reaction is performed at different temperatures and the reaction rate is determined. The plot of $\ln(k/T)$ versus $1/T$ gives a straight line with slope $-\Delta H^\ddagger/ R$ from which the enthalpy of activation can be derived and with intercept $\ln(\kappa k_\mathrm{B} / h) + \Delta S^\ddagger/ R$ from which the entropy of activation is derived.

== Accuracy ==
Transition state theory requires a value of the transmission coefficient, called $\kappa$ in that theory. This value is often taken to be unity (i.e., the species passing through the transition state $AB^\ddagger$ always proceed directly to products AB and never revert to reactants A and B). To avoid specifying a value of $\kappa$, the rate constant can be compared to the value of the rate constant at some fixed reference temperature (i.e., $\ k(T)/k(T_{\rm Ref})$) which eliminates the $\kappa$ factor in the resulting expression if one assumes that the transmission coefficient is independent of temperature.

== Error propagation formulas ==
Error propagation formulas for $\Delta H^\ddagger$ and $\Delta S^\ddagger$ have been published.
