= Semiclassical transition state theory =

Chemical reaction rate theory

Semiclassical Transition State Theory (SCTST) is an efficient chemical rate theory, which aims to calculate accurate rate constants of chemical reactions, including nuclear quantum effects such as tunnelling, from ab initio quantum chemistry. The method makes use of the semiclassical WKB wavefunction, Bohr-sommerfeld theory and vibrational perturbation theory to derive an analytical relation for the probability of a particle transmitting through a potential barrier at some energy, E. It was first developed by Bill Miller and coworkers in the 1970's, and has been further developed to allow for application to larger systems and using more accurate potentials.
