= Transmission coefficient =

Concept in physics and chemistry

An electromagnetic (or any other) wave experiences partial transmittance and partial reflectance when the medium through which it travels suddenly changes.

The transmission coefficient is used in physics and electrical engineering when wave propagation in a medium containing discontinuities is considered. A transmission coefficient describes the amplitude, intensity, or total power of a transmitted wave relative to an incident wave.

== Overview ==
Different fields of application have different definitions for the term. All the meanings are very similar in concept: In chemistry, the transmission coefficient refers to a chemical reaction overcoming a potential barrier; in optics and telecommunications it is the amplitude of a wave transmitted through a medium or conductor to that of the incident wave; in quantum mechanics it is used to describe the behavior of waves incident on a barrier, in a way similar to optics and telecommunications.

Although conceptually the same, the details in each field differ, and in some cases the terms are not an exact analogy.

== Chemistry ==
In chemistry, in particular in transition state theory, there appears a certain "transmission coefficient" for overcoming a potential barrier. It is (often) taken to be unity for monomolecular reactions. It appears in the Eyring equation.

== Optics ==
In optics, transmission is the property of a substance to permit the passage of light, with some or none of the incident light being absorbed in the process. If some light is absorbed by the substance, then the transmitted light will be a combination of the wavelengths of the light that was transmitted and not absorbed. For example, a blue light filter appears blue because it absorbs red and green wavelengths. If white light is shone through the filter, the light transmitted also appears blue because of the absorption of the red and green wavelengths.

The transmission coefficient is a measure of how much of an electromagnetic wave (light) passes through a surface or an optical element. Transmission coefficients can be calculated for either the amplitude or the intensity of the wave. Either is calculated by taking the ratio of the value after the surface or element to the value before. The transmission coefficient for total power is generally the same as the coefficient for intensity.

== Telecommunications ==
In telecommunication, the transmission coefficient is the ratio of the amplitude of the complex transmitted wave to that of the incident wave at a discontinuity in the transmission line.

Consider a wave travelling through a transmission line with a step in impedance from $Z_\mathrm A$ to $Z_\mathrm B$. When the wave transitions through the impedance step, a portion of the wave $\Gamma$ will be reflected back to the source. Because the voltage on a transmission line is always the sum of the forward and reflected waves at that point, if the incident wave amplitude is 1, and the reflected wave is $\Gamma$, then the amplitude of the forward wave must be sum of the two waves or $(1 + \Gamma)$.

The value for $\Gamma$ is uniquely determined from first principles by noting that the incident power on the discontinuity must equal the sum of the power in the reflected and transmitted waves:

$${1 \over Z_\mathrm A} = {{\Gamma^2\over Z_\mathrm A} + {(1+ \Gamma)^2 \over Z_\mathrm B}}$$.

Solving the quadratic for $\Gamma$ leads both to the reflection coefficient:

$${\Gamma = {{Z_\mathrm B - Z_\mathrm A}\over{Z_\mathrm B + Z_\mathrm A}}}$$,

and to the transmission coefficient:

$${{1+\Gamma} = {{2 Z_\mathrm B}\over{Z_\mathrm B + Z_\mathrm A}}}$$.

The probability that a portion of a communications system, such as a line, circuit, channel or trunk, will meet specified performance criteria is also sometimes called the "transmission coefficient" of that portion of the system. The value of the transmission coefficient is inversely related to the quality of the line, circuit, channel or trunk.

== Quantum mechanics ==
In non-relativistic quantum mechanics, the transmission coefficient and related reflection coefficient are used to describe the behavior of waves incident on a barrier. The transmission coefficient represents the probability flux of the transmitted wave relative to that of the incident wave. This coefficient is often used to describe the probability of a particle tunneling through a barrier.

The transmission coefficient is defined in terms of the incident and transmitted probability current density J according to:

$$T = \frac{\vec J_\mathrm{trans}  \cdot \hat{n}}{\vec J_\mathrm{inc} \cdot \hat{n} },$$

where $\vec J_\mathrm{inc}$ is the probability current in the wave incident upon the barrier with normal unit vector $\hat{n}$ and $\vec J_\mathrm{trans}$ is the probability current in the wave moving away from the barrier on the other side.

The reflection coefficient R is defined analogously:

$$R = \frac{\vec J_\mathrm{refl}  \cdot \left(-\hat{n}\right)}{\vec J_\mathrm{inc} \cdot \hat{n}} = \frac{|J_\mathrm{refl}|}{|J_\mathrm{inc}|}$$

Law of total probability requires that $T + R = 1$, which in one dimension reduces to the fact that the sum of the transmitted and reflected currents is equal in magnitude to the incident current.

For sample calculations, see rectangular potential barrier.

=== WKB approximation ===
Using the WKB approximation, one can obtain a tunnelling coefficient that looks like

$$T = \frac{\displaystyle \exp\left(-2\int_{x_1}^{x_2} dx \sqrt{\frac{2m}{\hbar^2} \left( V(x) - E \right)}\,\right)}{\displaystyle \left( 1 + \frac{1}{4} \exp\left(-2\int_{x_1}^{x_2} dx \sqrt{\frac{2m}{\hbar^2} \left( V(x) - E \right)}\,\right) \right)^2}\ ,$$

where $x_1,\,x_2$ are the two classical turning points for the potential barrier. In the classical limit of all other physical parameters much larger than the reduced Planck constant, denoted $\hbar \rightarrow 0$, the transmission coefficient goes to zero. This classical limit would have failed in the situation of a square potential.

If the transmission coefficient is much less than 1, it can be approximated with the following formula:

$$T \approx 16 \frac{E}{U_0} \left(1-\frac{E}{U_0}\right) \exp\left(-2 L \sqrt{\frac{2m}{\hbar^2} (U_0-E)}\right)$$

where $L = x_2 - x_1$ is the length of the barrier potential.

== See also ==
- Reflection coefficient
- Reflections of signals on conducting lines
