= Meredith Gwynne Evans =

British chemist

- Evans in 1949
- Born: 2 December 1904; Atherton, Lancashire, England
- Died: 25 December 1952 (aged 48); Manchester, England
- Education: University of Manchester
- Known for: Transition State Theory
- Awards: Fellow of the Royal Society; Tilden Prize (1949)
- Scientific career
- Workplaces: University of Leeds; Princeton University; University of Manchester
- Doctoral advisor: Arthur Lapworth
- Doctoral students: Noel Hush; George Porter; Alec Sehon; Huw O. Pritchard

Meredith Gwynne Evans, FRS (2 December 1904 – 25 December 1952) was a British physical chemist who made important contributions to the theory of chemical reaction rates and reaction mechanisms. Together with Henry Eyring and Michael Polanyi, Evans is one of the founders of the transition state theory.

== Early life and education ==
Meredith Gwynne Evans was born in Atherton, Lancashire, on 2 December 1904 and the son of Frederick George Evans, an elementary schoolmaster from Pembrokeshire, Wales, and his wife, Margaretta Eleanora Williams. He was the eldest son in a family of three sons and one daughter.

Evans attended the elementary school where his father was Headmaster, won a County Scholarship to Leigh Grammar School, and was educated at the University of Manchester.

One of MG's brothers, AG Evans, worked with him and later took the chair of chemistry at University College Cardiff, beating off the challenge of E. A. Moelwyn-Hughes. His other brother, David, was a microbiologist who worked on vaccines.

== Career ==
Evans was appointed Assistant Lecturer at the University of Manchester in 1929 and elected to membership of the Manchester Literary and Philosophical Society on October 29th, 1929. He remained in that post until 1939, when he became Professor of Physical Chemistry at the University of Leeds. One of Evans' students was George Porter, who later noted (in a conversation with Sir John Meurig Thomas) that Evans was the most brilliant chemist he had ever met. (George Porter went on to win the Nobel Prize for Chemistry in 1967.) Evans returned to the University of Manchester in 1949. He was elected a Fellow of the Royal Society in 1947.

=== Research ===
His earliest research was on problems of adsorption of gases on chabazite and other zeolites. Later on, he started working on theoretical chemistry and its link with quantum mechanics. In this research field, he worked with Douglas Hartree and Lawrence Bragg to apply quantum mechanics to chemical problems.

In 1933, M. G. Evans was awarded a Rockefeller Scholarship and went to Princeton University to work with Hugh Taylor and Henry Eyring, amongst others. Back in Manchester, Evans became one of Michael Polanyi's principal coworkers on the development of the transition state theory. In 1935, with only one month difference, both Henry Eyring in Princeton, and Michael Polanyi and Meredith Gwynne Evans in Manchester published the founding papers on transition state theory, formulating what is now known as the "Eyring equation" which opened up a new era in the study of chemical kinetics.

== Death ==
Evans died on 25 December 1952 in Manchester.

== See also ==
- Chemical kinetics
- Transition state theory
- Eyring equation
- Henry Eyring
- Michael Polanyi
