= Variational transition-state theory =

Variational transition-state theory is a refinement of transition-state theory. When using transition-state theory to estimate a chemical reaction rate, the dividing surface is taken to be a surface that intersects a first-order saddle point and is also perpendicular to the reaction coordinate in all other dimensions. When using variational transition-state theory, the position of the dividing surface between reactant and product regions is variationally optimized to minimize the reaction rate. This minimizes the effects of recrossing, and gives a much more accurate result.
