= Henry Eyring (chemist) =

Mexican-born American chemist (1901–1981)

- Henry Eyring in 1951
- Born: February 20, 1901; Colonia Juárez, Chihuahua, Mexico
- Died: December 26, 1981 (aged 80); Salt Lake City, Utah, United States
- Education: University of Arizona; University of California, Berkeley
- Known for: Transition state theory
- Spouse(s): Mildred Bennion; Winifred Brennan
- Children: 3, including Henry B. Eyring
- Awards: Wolf Prize in Chemistry (1980); Priestley Medal (1975); Elliott Cresson Medal (1969); Irving Langmuir Award (1968); National Medal of Science (1966); Peter Debye Award (1964); William H. Nichols Medal (1951); Newcomb Cleveland Prize (1932)
- Scientific career
- Fields: Chemistry
- Institutions: Princeton University; University of Utah
- Doctoral students: Keith J. Laidler; J O Hirschfelder; Walter Kauzmann; John Calvin Giddings
- Other notable students: John L. Magee

Henry Eyring (February 20, 1901 – December 26, 1981) was a Mexico-born United States theoretical chemist whose primary contribution was in the study of chemical reaction rates and intermediates. Eyring developed the absolute rate theory or transition state theory (TST) of chemical reactions, connecting the fields of chemistry and physics through atomic theory, quantum theory, and statistical mechanics.

== History ==
Eyring, a third-generation member of the Church of Jesus Christ of Latter-day Saints (LDS Church), was reared on a cattle ranch in Colonia Juárez, Chihuahua, a Mormon colony, for the first 11 years of his life. His father, Edward Christian Eyring, practiced plural marriage; Edward married Caroline Romney (1893) and her sister, Emma Romney (1903), both daughters of Miles Park Romney, the great-grandfather of Mitt Romney.

In July 1912, the Eyrings and about 4,200 other immigrants were driven out of Mexico by violent insurgents during the Mexican Revolution and moved to El Paso, Texas. After living in El Paso for approximately one year, the Eyrings relocated to Pima, Arizona, where he completed high school and showed a special aptitude for mathematics and science. He also studied at Gila Academy in Thatcher, Arizona, now Eastern Arizona College. One of the pillars at the front of the main building still bears his name, along with that of his sister Camilla's husband, Spencer W. Kimball, later an LDS Church president.

Eyring earned a bachelor's degree in mining engineering at the University of Arizona by working in a copper mine. He then received a fellowship from the US Bureau of Mines fellowship and earned a master's degree in metallurgy. Having seen the high rates of accidents in the mines, and breathed sulfur fumes from blast furnaces at a smelter, he chose to do his Ph.D. in chemistry. He received his doctoral degree in chemistry from the University of California, Berkeley in 1927 for a thesis on A Comparison of the Ionization by, and Stopping Power for, Alpha Particles of Elements and Compounds.

Princeton University recruited Eyring as an instructor in 1931, where he continued until 1946. In 1946, he was offered a position as dean of the graduate school at the University of Utah (U of U), with professorships in chemistry and metallurgy. The chemistry building on the U of U campus is now named in his honor.

A prolific writer, Eyring authored more than 600 scientific articles, ten scientific books, and a few books on the subject of science and religion. He received the Wolf Prize in Chemistry in 1980 and the National Medal of Science in 1966 for developing the absolute rate theory or TST of chemical reactions, one of the most important developments of 20th-century chemistry.

Several other chemists later received the Nobel Prize for work based on the absolute rate theory, and his failure to receive the Nobel was a matter of surprise to many. The Nobel Prize organization admitted that "Strangely, Eyring never received a Nobel Prize"; the Royal Swedish Academy of Sciences apparently did not understand Eyring's theory until it was too late to award him the Nobel. The academy awarded him the Berzelius Medal in 1977 as partial compensation. Sterling M. McMurrin believed Eyring should have received the Nobel Prize but was not awarded it because of his religion.

Eyring was elected president of the American Chemical Society in 1963 and the Association for the Advancement of Science in 1965.

== Personal life ==
Eyring married Mildred Bennion. She was a native of Granger, Utah, who had a degree from the U of U and served as head of the physical education department there. She met Eyring while pursuing a doctorate at the University of Wisconsin. They had three sons. The oldest, Edward M. "Ted" Eyring was an emeritus professor of chemistry at the U of U. The second, Henry B. Eyring is an LDS Church apostle, while the youngest son, Harden B. Eyring, was a higher education administrator for the State of Utah. Eyring's wife, Mildred, died June 25, 1969, in Salt Lake City, Utah. On August 13, 1971, he married Winifred Brennan in the LDS Church's Salt Lake Temple.

Eyring was a member of the LDS Church throughout his life. His views of science and religion were captured in this quote: "Is there any conflict between science and religion? There is no conflict in the mind of God, but often there is conflict in the minds of men." Eyring also feared overeager defenders of faith would discard new scientific findings because of apparent contradictions. He encouraged parents and teachers to distinguish between "what they know to be true and what they think may be true," to avoid clumping them together and "throwing the baby out with the bath."

As a member of the LDS Church, Eyring served as a branch president, district president, and, for over twenty years, a member of the general board of the Deseret Sunday School Union. As of 2026, his son, Henry B. Eyring, continues as a member of the church's First Presidency, after first being called, and is also the president of the Quorum of the Twelve Apostles.

== Awards ==
- AAAS Newcomb Cleveland Prize (1932)
- Bingham Medal (1949) of the Society of Rheology
- Peter Debye Award in Physical Chemistry (1964)
- National Medal of Science (1966)
- Irving Langmuir Award (1967)
- Linus Pauling Award (1969)
- Elliott Cresson Medal (1969) from the Franklin Institute
- Golden Plate Award of the American Academy of Achievement (1974)
- T. W. Richards Medal (1975)
- Priestley Medal (1975)
- Berzelius Medal (1979)
- Wolf Prize (1980)
- Member of International Academy of Quantum Molecular Science
- Member of U.S. National Academy of Sciences
- Member of the American Philosophical Society
- Member of the American Academy of Arts and Sciences

== Scientific publications: books ==
Henry Eyring authored, co-authored, or edited the following books or journals:

- A generalized theory of plasticity involving the virial theorem
- The activated complex in chemisorption and catalysis
- An examination into the origin, possible synthesis, and physical properties of diamonds
- Annual Review of Physical Chemistry
- Basic chemical kinetics
- Deformation Kinetics with Alexander Stephen Krausz
- Electrochemistry
- Kinetic evidence of phase structure
- Modern Chemical Kinetics
- Non-classical reaction kinetics
- Physical Chemistry, an Advanced Treatise (1970)
- Quantum Chemistry
- Reactions in condensed phases
- The significance of isotopic reactions in rate theory
- Significant Liquid Structures
- Some aspects of catalytic hydrogenation
- Statistical Mechanics
- Statistical Mechanics and Dynamics
- Theoretical Chemistry: Advances and Perspectives. Volume 2
- The Theory of Rate Processes in Biology and Medicine with Frank H. Johnson and Betsy Jones Stover
- Theory of Optical Activity (Monographs on Chemistry series) with D.J. Caldwell
- Time and Change
- Valency

== Religious publications: books ==
- Reflections of a Scientist (1983)
- The Faith of a Scientist. Bookcraft, Inc. (1967); 1989 edition. ISBN 1-60641-125-X.
- Science and Your Faith in God: A Selected Compilation of Writings and Talks by Prominent Latter-Day Saints Scientists on the Subjects of Science and Religion. Bookcraft, Inc. (1958); compiled by Paul R. Green and featuring the writings of Henry Eyring and others LCCN 59-902 ISBN 058841011X

== See also ==
- Eyring equation
- Mormon Scientist: The Life and Faith of Henry Eyring
