= Hammond's postulate =

Hypothesis in physical organic chemistry

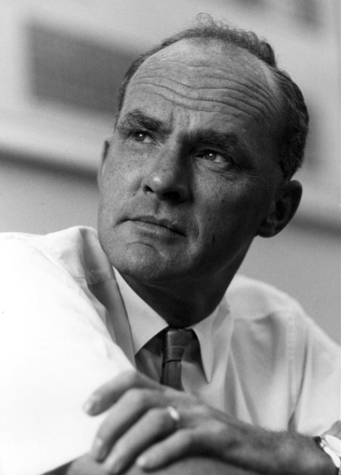
George Hammond developed the postulate during his professorship at Iowa State University

Hammond's postulate (or alternatively the Hammond–Leffler postulate), is a hypothesis in physical organic chemistry which describes the geometric structure of the transition state in an organic chemical reaction. First proposed by George Hammond in 1955, the postulate states that:

If two states, as, for example, a transition state and an unstable intermediate, occur consecutively during a reaction process and have nearly the same energy content, their interconversion will involve only a small reorganization of the molecular structures.

Therefore, the geometric structure of a state can be predicted by comparing its energy to the species neighboring it along the reaction coordinate. For example, in an exothermic reaction the transition state is closer in energy to the reactants than to the products. Therefore, the transition state will be more geometrically similar to the reactants than to the products. In contrast, however, in an endothermic reaction the transition state is closer in energy to the products than to the reactants. So, according to Hammond's postulate the structure of the transition state would resemble the products more than the reactants. This type of comparison is especially useful because most transition states cannot be characterized experimentally.

Hammond's postulate also helps to explain and rationalize the Bell–Evans–Polanyi principle. Namely, this principle describes the experimental observation that the rate of a reaction, and therefore its activation energy, is affected by the enthalpy of that reaction. Hammond's postulate explains this observation by describing how varying the enthalpy of a reaction would also change the structure of the transition state. In turn, this change in geometric structure would alter the energy of the transition state, and therefore the activation energy and reaction rate as well.

The postulate has also been used to predict the shape of reaction coordinate diagrams. For example, electrophilic aromatic substitution involves a distinct intermediate and two less well defined states. By measuring the effects of aromatic substituents and applying Hammond's postulate it was concluded that the rate-determining step involves formation of a transition state that should resemble the intermediate complex.

== History ==
During the 1940s and 1950s, chemists had trouble explaining why even slight changes in the reactants caused significant differences in the rate and product distributions of a reaction. In 1955 George Hammond, a young professor at Iowa State University, postulated that transition-state theory could be used to qualitatively explain the observed structure-reactivity relationships. Notably, John E. Leffler of Florida State University proposed a similar idea in 1953. However, Hammond's version has received more attention since its qualitative nature was easier to understand and employ than Leffler's complex mathematical equations. Hammond's postulate is sometimes called the Hammond–Leffler postulate to give credit to both scientists.

== Interpreting the postulate ==
Effectively, the postulate states that the structure of a transition state resembles that of the species nearest to it in free energy. This can be explained with reference to potential energy diagrams:

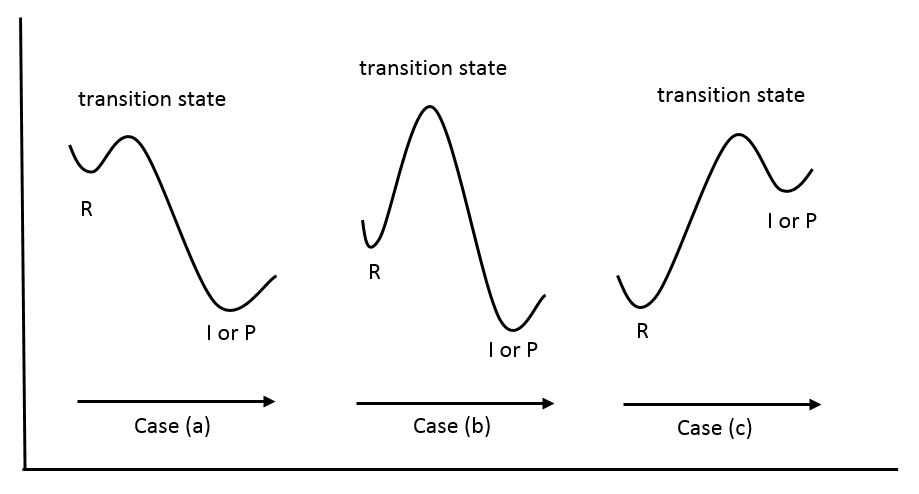
Energy diagrams showing how to interpret Hammond's Postulate

In case (a), which is an exothermic reaction, the energy of the transition state is closer in energy to that of the reactant than that of the intermediate or the product. Therefore, from the postulate, the structure of the transition state also more closely resembles that of the reactant. In case (b), the energy of the transition state is close to neither the reactant nor the product, making none of them a good structural model for the transition state. Further information would be needed in order to predict the structure or characteristics of the transition state. Case (c) depicts the potential diagram for an endothermic reaction, in which, according to the postulate, the transition state should more closely resemble that of the intermediate or the product.

Another significance of Hammond's postulate is that it permits us to discuss the structure of the transition state in terms of the reactants, intermediates, or products. In the case where the transition state closely resembles the reactants, the transition state is called “early” while a “late” transition state is the one that closely resembles the intermediate or the product.

An example of the “early” transition state is chlorination. Chlorination favors the products because it is an exothermic reaction, which means that the products are lower in energy than the reactants. When looking at the adjacent diagram (representation of an "early" transition state), one must focus on the transition state, which is not able to be observed during an experiment. To understand what is meant by an “early” transition state, the Hammond postulate represents a curve that shows the kinetics of this reaction. Since the reactants are higher in energy, the transition state appears to be right after the reaction starts.

An example of the “late” transition state is bromination. Bromination favors the reactants because it is an endothermic reaction, which means that the reactants are lower in energy than the products. Since the transition state is hard to observe, the postulate of bromination helps to picture the “late” transition state (see the representation of the "late" transition state). Since the products are higher in energy, the transition state appears to be right before the reaction is complete.

One other useful interpretation of the postulate often found in textbooks of organic chemistry is the following:

Assume that the transition states for reactions involving unstable intermediates can be closely approximated by the intermediates themselves.

This interpretation ignores extremely exothermic and endothermic reactions which are relatively unusual and relates the transition state to the intermediates which are usually the most unstable.

== Structure of transition states ==
=== S_{N}1 reactions ===
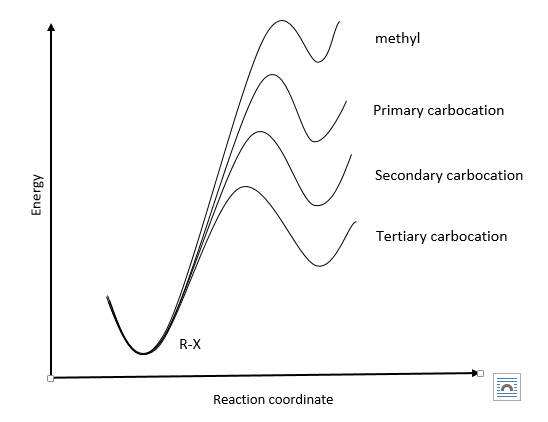
Energy diagrams of S_{N}1 reactions

Hammond's postulate can be used to examine the structure of the transition states of a SN1 reaction. In particular, the dissociation of the leaving group is the first transition state in a S_{N}1 reaction. The stabilities of the carbocations formed by this dissociation are known to follow the trend tertiary > secondary > primary > methyl.

Therefore, since the tertiary carbocation is relatively stable and therefore close in energy to the R-X reactant, then the tertiary transition state will have a structure that is fairly similar to the R-X reactant. In terms of the graph of reaction coordinate versus energy, this is shown by the fact that the tertiary transition state is further to the left than the other transition states. In contrast, the energy of a methyl carbocation is very high, and therefore the structure of the transition state is more similar to the intermediate carbocation than to the R-X reactant. Accordingly, the methyl transition state is very far to the right.

=== S_{N}2 reactions ===
Bimolecular nucleophilic substitution (SN2) reactions are concerted reactions where both the nucleophile and substrate are involved in the rate limiting step. Since this reaction is concerted, the reaction occurs in one step, where the bonds are broken, while new bonds are formed. Therefore, to interpret this reaction, it is important to look at the transition state, which resembles the concerted rate limiting step. In the "Depiction of S_{N}2 Reaction" figure, the nucleophile forms a new bond to the carbon, while the halide (L) bond is broken.

=== E1 reactions ===
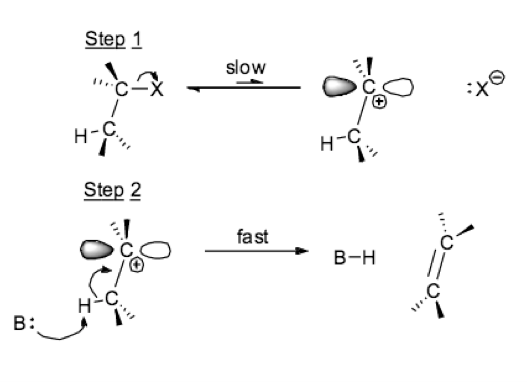
Unimolecular Elimination Reaction Mechanism

An E1 reaction consists of a unimolecular elimination, where the rate determining step of the mechanism depends on the removal of a single molecular species. This is a two-step mechanism. The more stable the carbocation intermediate is, the faster the reaction will proceed, favoring the products. Stabilization of the carbocation intermediate lowers the activation energy. The reactivity order is (CH_{3})_{3}C- > (CH_{3})_{2}CH- > CH_{3}CH_{2}- > CH_{3}-.

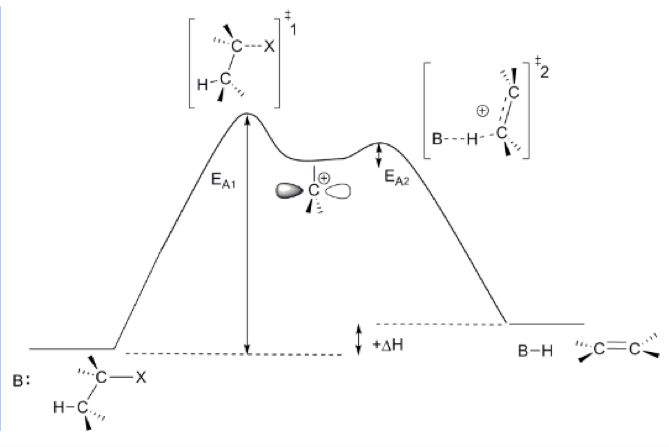
Unimolecular Elimination Reaction Coordinate

Furthermore, studies describe a typical kinetic resolution process that starts out with two enantiomers that are energetically equivalent and, in the end, forms two energy-inequivalent intermediates, referred to as diastereomers. According to Hammond's postulate, the more stable diastereomer is formed faster.

=== E2 reactions ===
Elimination, bimolecular reactions are one step, concerted reaction where both base and substrate participate in the rate limiting step. In an E2 mechanism, a base takes a proton near the leaving group, forcing the electrons down to make a double bond, and forcing off the leaving group-all in one concerted step. The rate law depends on the first order concentration of two reactants, making it a 2nd order (bimolecular) elimination reaction. Factors that affect the rate determining step are stereochemistry, leaving groups, and base strength.

A theory, for an E2 reaction, by Joseph Bunnett suggests the lowest pass through the energy barrier between reactants and products is gained by an adjustment between the degrees of C_{β}-H and C_{α}-X rupture at the transition state. The adjustment involves much breaking of the bond more easily broken, and a small amount of breaking of the bond which requires more energy. This conclusion by Bunnett is a contradiction from the Hammond postulate. The Hammond postulate is the opposite of what Bunnett theorized. In the transition state of a bond breaking step it involves little breaking when the bond is easily broken and much breaking when it is difficult to break. Despite these differences, the two postulates are not in conflict since they are concerned with different sorts of processes. Hammond focuses on reaction steps where one bond is made or broken, or the breaking of two or more bonds is done with no time taken occur simultaneously. The E2 theory transition state concerns a process when bond formation or breaking are not simultaneous.

== Kinetics and the Bell–Evans–Polanyi principle ==
Technically, Hammond's postulate only describes the geometric structure of a chemical reaction. However, Hammond's postulate indirectly gives information about the rate, kinetics, and activation energy of reactions. Hence, it gives a theoretical basis for the understanding the Bell–Evans–Polanyi principle, which describes the experimental observation that the enthalpy and rate of a similar reactions were usually correlated.

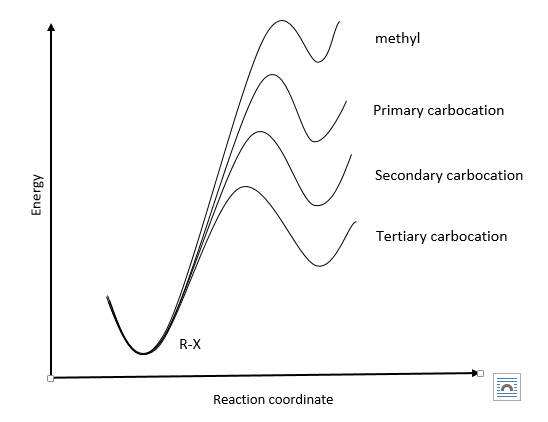
Energy diagrams of S_{N}1 reactions

The relationship between Hammond's postulate and the BEP principle can be understood by considering a S_{N}1 reaction. Although two transition states occur during a S_{N}1 reaction (dissociation of the leaving group and then attack by the nucleophile), the dissociation of the leaving group is almost always the rate-determining step. Hence, the activation energy and therefore rate of the reaction will depend only upon the dissociation step.

First, consider the reaction at secondary and tertiary carbons. As the BEP principle notes, experimentally S_{N}1 reactions at tertiary carbons are faster than at secondary carbons. Therefore, by definition, the transition state for tertiary reactions will be at a lower energy than for secondary reactions. However, the BEP principle cannot justify why the energy is lower.

Using Hammond's postulate, the lower energy of the tertiary transition state means that its structure is relatively closer to its reactants R(tertiary)-X than to the carbocation product when compared to the secondary case. Thus, the tertiary transition state will be more geometrically similar to the R(tertiary)-X reactants than the secondary transition state is to its R(secondary)-X reactants. Hence, if the tertiary transition state is close in structure to the (low energy) reactants, then it will also be lower in energy because structure determines energy. Likewise, if the secondary transition state is more similar to the (high energy) carbocation product, then it will be higher in energy.

== Applying the postulate ==
Hammond's postulate is useful for understanding the relationship between the rate of a reaction and the stability of the products. While the rate of a reaction depends just on the activation energy (often represented in organic chemistry as ΔG^{‡} “delta G double dagger”), the final ratios of products in chemical equilibrium depends only on the standard free-energy change ΔG (“delta G”). The ratio of the final products at equilibrium corresponds directly with the stability of those products.

Hammond's postulate connects the rate of a reaction process with the structural features of those states that form part of it, by saying that the molecular reorganizations have to be small in those steps that involve two states that are very close in energy. This gave birth to the structural comparison between the starting materials, products, and the possible "stable intermediates" that led to the understanding that the most stable product is not always the one that is favored in a reaction process.

== Explaining seemingly contradictory results ==
Hammond's postulate is especially important when looking at the rate-limiting step of a reaction. However, one must be cautious when examining a multistep reaction or one with the possibility of rearrangements during an intermediate stage. In some cases, the final products appear in skewed ratios in favor of a more unstable product (called the kinetic product) rather than the more stable product (the thermodynamic product). In this case one must examine the rate-limiting step and the intermediates. Often, the rate-limiting step is the initial formation of an unstable species such as a carbocation. Then, once the carbocation is formed, subsequent rearrangements can occur. In these kinds of reactions, especially when run at lower temperatures, the reactants simply react before the rearrangements necessary to form a more stable intermediate have time to occur. At higher temperatures when microscopic reversal is easier, the more stable thermodynamic product is favored because these intermediates have time to rearrange. Whether run at high or low temperatures, the mixture of the kinetic and thermodynamic products eventually reach the same ratio, one in favor of the more stable thermodynamic product, when given time to equilibrate due to microreversal.

== See also ==
- Bema Hapothle
- Curtin–Hammett principle
- Microscopic reversibility
- Bell–Evans–Polanyi principle
