= Ludwig Barth zu Barthenau =

Austrian chemist

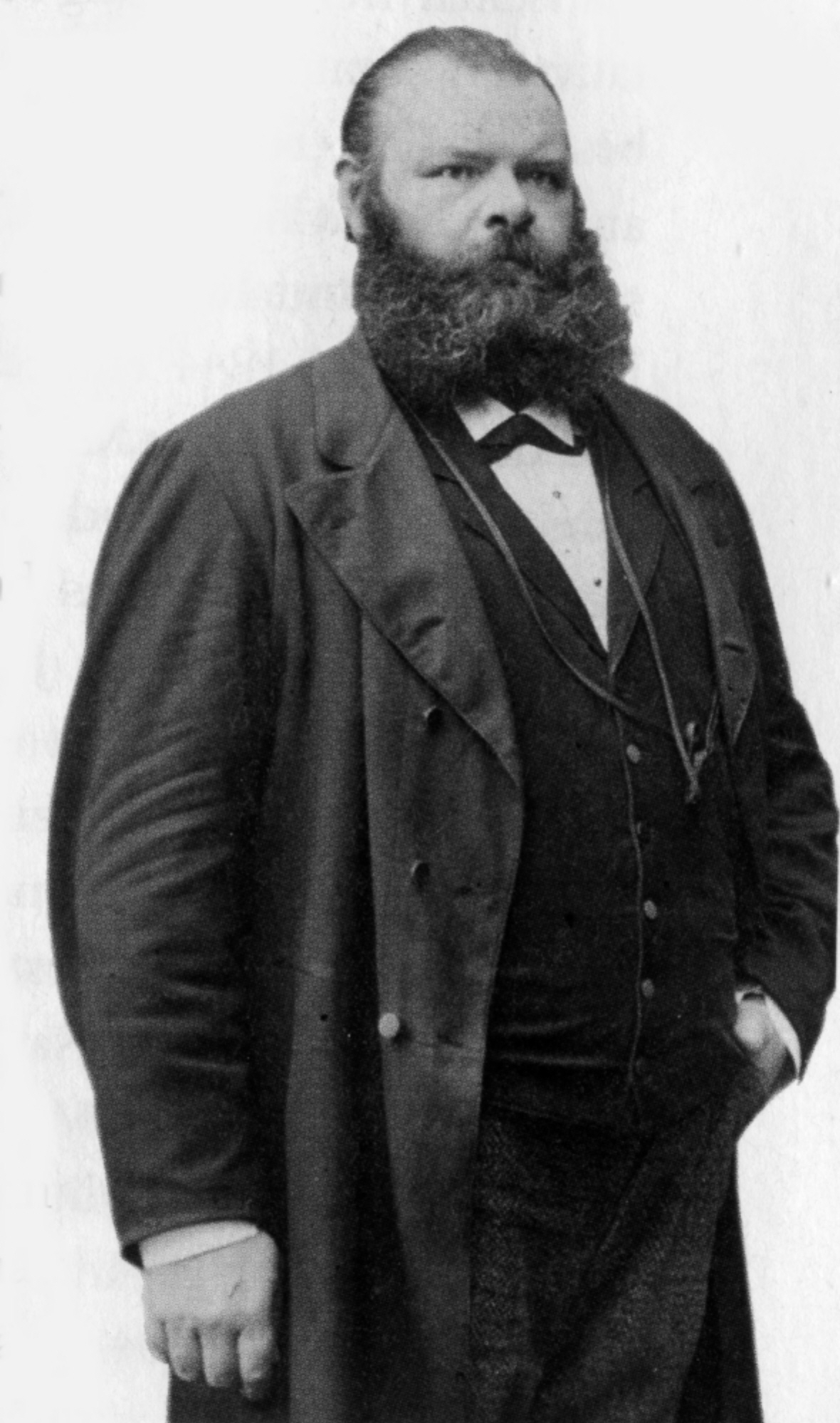
- Born: January 17, 1839; Rovereto
- Died: August 3, 1890
- Known for: Resorcinol isolation
- Scientific career
- Workplaces: University of Innsbruck
- Doctoral advisor: Heinrich Hlasiwetz
- Doctoral students: Rudolf Wegscheider

Ludwig Barth zu Barthenau (17 January 1839 – 3 August 1890) was an Austrian chemist born in Rovereto.

He studied under Justus von Liebig (1803-1873) at the Ludwig-Maximilians-Universität München, and in 1867 was appointed professor of chemistry at the University of Innsbruck. In 1876, he succeeded Heinrich Hlasiwetz (1825-1875) as professor of chemistry at the University of Vienna.

He is remembered for his studies of benzol derivatives, and is credited with the discovery of resorcinol. With Adolf Lieben (1836-1914), he founded the journal Monatshefte für Chemie.

== Published works ==
- Über die Einwirkung des Chlors auf den Amylalkohol, 1861 – The action of chlorine on amyl alcohol.
- Über die Einwirkung des Broms auf Glycerin, 1862 – The action of bromine on glycerol.
