= Omsk State Pedagogical University =

University in Omsk, Russia

- Омский Государственный Педагогический Университет
- Type: Public
- Established: March 25, 1932
- Rector: Natalia Makarova
- Location: Omsk, Omsk Oblast, Russia; 54.9906°N 73.3628°E
- Campus: Urban
- Language: Russian
- Website: omgpu.ru/en/
- Location in Omsk Location in Russia

Omsk State Pedagogical University (Russian: Омский Государственный Педагогический Университет) is a university in Omsk, Russia.

== History ==
Omsk State Pedagogical University was founded by decree No. 298 of the Council of People's Commissars of the RSFSR on March 25, 1932, as Omsk Pedagogical Institute. Initially the institute consisted of three faculties: Philological, Physics and Mathematics, and Biology and Chemistry. The first graduation—79 specialists.

== Structure ==
=== Faculties ===
- Faculty of Philology
- Faculty of History, Philosophy and Law
- Faculty of Foreign Languages
- Faculty of Mathematics, Computer Science, Physics and Technology
- Faculty of Elementary, Preschool and Special Education
- Faculty of Psychology and Pedagogy
- Faculty of Economics, Management, Service and Tourism
- Faculty of Science Education
- Faculty of Arts
- Center for Master's Studies

=== Branches ===
- Omsk State Pedagogical University branch in Tara

== Notable people ==
=== Alumni ===
- Aleksandr Gorban
- Yegor Letov
- Sergey Letov
- Oleg Smolin
- Anatoly Konenko
