= Bema Hapothle =

Acronym in chemistry

In chemistry, Bema Hapothle is an extended acronym for Bell–Marcus–Hammond–Polanyi–Thornton–Leffler, referring to the combined contribution of the theories of these chemists to the rationalization of changes in transition state structure to perturbations, such as change of reaction solvent.

== See also ==
- Hammond–Leffler postulate
