= Svetlana Kirdina =

Russian sociologist (born 1955)

Svetlana Kirdina-Chandler
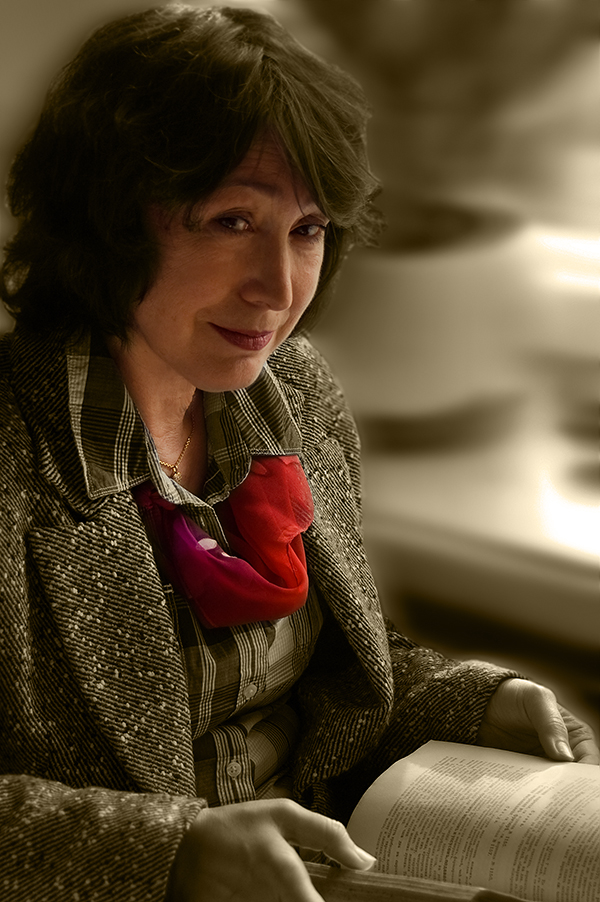
- Born: 16 September 1955 (age 70); Omsk, Russia
- Education: Novosibirsk State University
- Website: www.kirdina.ru/eng/index.php

Svetlana Kirdina-Chandler (Светла́на Гео́ргиевна Ки́рдина-Чэндлер) is a Russian sociologist and economist. Scientific career began in the Novosibirsk School of Economic Sociology. Doctor of Social Sciences, PhD. Research interests: sociological theory, institutions, economic theory, the theory of institutional matrices, transients in Russian society. Author of over 160 scientific papers, the most important of which are devoted to the development and applications of the theory of institutional matrix. She introduced two main and particular interdependent types of institutional matrices existing around the world, X-matrices and Y-matrices.

The X-matrix is characterized by the following basic institutions:

- In the economic sphere: institutions of a redistributive economy;
- In the political sphere: institutions of a unitary (unitary-centralized) political order;
- In the ideological sphere: institutions of communitarian ideology, the essence of which is expressed by the idea of dominance of collective, shared, public values over individual, sovereign, private ones, the priority of We over I.

The following basic institutions characterize the Y-matrix:

- In the economic sphere: institutions of a market economy;
- In the political sphere: institutions of a federative (federative-subsidiary) political order;
- In the ideological sphere: institutions of an individualistic (or subsidiary) ideology, which proclaims the dominance of individual values over the values of larger communities, bearing a subordinate character to groups and the personality, i.e. the priority of I over We.

X-economies and Y-economies could, according to Kirdina, borrow certain properties from each other while keeping their institutional core, although a complete replacement of X-matrix with Y-matrix was not possible (at least for a large country). Rather, changes in the basic institutions were likely to result in the destruction of the society as a whole. A typical example was the fate of the Roman Empire (Kirdina, 2000, 201-202). Basic to Kirdina's position was a refusal to consider the market economy as superior to non-market ones, and thus she did not consider the transition from non-market to market economies as progress or modernization." To her both systems were of equal merit, and each of them was effective in its appropriate place.

The main scientific results is proposed and developed the theoretical concept of institutional matrices, the essence of which is to provide a social and economic structure in the form of a combination of two matrices of basic institutions. In this case, one of the matrices has historically dominant character. The concept empirically confirmed extensive historical material and data of modern Russian and Comparative Studies, and served as the basis of weather institutional dynamics of Russian society, confirmed in practice.

Svetlana Kirdina is a stepsister of Alexander Gorban.
