= Temporal analysis of products =

Experimental technique to study kinetics

Temporal Analysis of Products (TAP), (TAP-2), (TAP-3) is an experimental technique for studying the kinetics of physico-chemical interactions between gases and complex solid materials, primarily heterogeneous catalysts. The TAP methodology is based on short pulse-response experiments at low background pressure (10^{−6}-10^{2} Pa), which are used to probe different steps in a catalytic process on the surface of a porous material including diffusion, adsorption, surface reactions, and desorption.

== History ==
Since its invention by Dr. John T. Gleaves (then at Monsanto Company) in late 1980s, TAP has been used to study a variety of industrially and academically relevant catalytic reactions, bridging the gap between surface science experiments and applied catalysis. The state-of-the-art TAP installations (TAP-3) do not only provide better signal-to-noise ratio than the first generation TAP machines (TAP-1), but also allow for advanced automation and direct coupling with other techniques.

== Hardware ==
TAP instrument consists of a heated packed-bed microreactor connected to a high-throughput vacuum system, a pulsing manifold with fast electromagnetically driven gas injectors, and a Quadrupole Mass Spectrometer (QMS) located in the vacuum system below the micro-reactor outlet.

== Experiments ==
In a typical TAP pulse-response experiment, very small (~10^{−9} mol) and narrow (~100 μs) gas pulses are introduced into the evacuated (~10^{−6} torr) microreactor containing a catalytic sample. While the injected gas molecules traverse the microreactor packing through the interstitial voids, they encounter the catalyst on which they may undergo chemical transformations. Unconverted and newly formed gas molecules eventually reach the reactor's outlet and escape into an adjacent vacuum chamber, where they are detected with millisecond time resolution by the QMS. The exit-flow rates of reactants, products and inert molecules recorded by the QMS are then used to quantify catalytic properties and deduce reaction mechanisms. The same TAP instrument can typically accommodate other types of kinetic measurements, including atmospheric pressure flow experiments (10^{5} Pa), Temperature-Programmed Desorption (TPD), and Steady-State Isotopic Transient Kinetic Analysis (SSITKA).

== Data analysis ==
The general methodology of TAP data analysis, developed in a series of papers by Grigoriy (Gregory) Yablonsky , is based on comparing an inert gas response which is controlled only by Knudsen diffusion with a reactive gas response which is controlled by diffusion as well as adsorption and chemical reactions on the catalyst sample. TAP pulse-response experiments can be effectively modeled by a one-dimensional (1D) diffusion equation with uniquely simple combination of boundary conditions.
