= Martin Feinberg =

American mathematician

- Born: April 2, 1942 (age 84); New York City, New York, US
- Education: Cooper Union, Purdue University, Princeton University
- Known for: Chemical reaction network theory
- Awards: John Von Neumann Lecture in Theoretical Biology, Institute for Advanced Study, 1997; AIChE Richard H. Wilhelm Award; Camille & Henry Dreyfus Teacher- Scholar, 1974
- Scientific career
- Fields: Mathematics, Chemical engineering, Biology
- Workplaces: Ohio State University
- Doctoral advisor: William Schowalter

Martin Feinberg is an American chemical engineer and mathematician known for his work in chemical reaction network theory.

== Life ==
Born in New York, Feinberg received his undergraduate degree in chemical engineering from The Cooper Union for the Advancement of Science and Art in 1962. A year later, he obtained his master's degree from Purdue University. In 1968, he received his PhD degree from Princeton University. The subject of the doctoral thesis is fluid mechanics and the advisor is William Schowalter. After completing the PhD, he went to work at the University of Rochester, Rochester, NY, where he was a professor of chemical engineering until 1997. He then moved to The Ohio State University, where he serves as Richard M. Morrow Professor of Chemical Engineering and professor of mathematics. Feinberg was a member of the editorial board of the Archive for Rational Mechanics and Analysis from 1978–1991.

== Research ==
Together with F. J. M. Horn and Roy Jackson, Feinberg created chemical reaction network theory, a field of mathematics that connects the graphical and algebraic structure of chemical reaction networks with their dynamic behavior. He is best known for stating and proving the deficiency zero theorem (together with Horn and Jackson) and the deficiency one theorem. He has also articulated complete necessary and sufficient conditions for detailed balancing in mass-action systems. More recently, Feinberg has turned his attention to problems arising from biology. Together with Gheorghe Craciun, he developed the theory of injective reaction networks and explored its implications for biochemistry. A current research focus (together with Guy Shinar) is the application of chemical reaction network theory to questions of robustness in biochemical reaction networks. He has also worked with Richard Lavine on foundations of classical thermodynamics. Feinberg is the author of "Foundations of Chemical Reaction Network Theory," published in 2019 by Springer in its Applied Mathematical Sciences series.

== Selected publications ==
- Feinberg, M. (2019) "Foundations of Chemical Reaction Network Theory," Springer, Switzerland, ISBN 978-3-030-03857-1
- Feinberg, M. (1979) "Lectures on Chemical Reaction Networks", https://zenodo.org/records/10631900
- Feinberg, M. (1987). "Chemical reaction network structure and the stability of complex isothermal reactors: I. The deficiency zero and deficiency one theorems". Chemical Engineering Science. 42 (10): 2229–2268. doi:10.1016/0009-2509(87)80099-4.
- Feinberg, M. (1989). "Necessary and sufficient conditions for detailed balancing in mass action systems of arbitrary complexity". Chemical Engineering Science. 44 (9): 1819–1827. doi:10.1016/0009-2509(89)85124-3.
- Schlosser, P. M. & M. Feinberg (June 1994). "A theory of multiple steady states in isothermal homogeneous CFSTRs with many reactions". Chemical Engineering Science. 49 (11): 1749–1767. doi:10.1016/0009-2509(94)80061-8.
- Feinberg, M. (December 1995). "The existence and uniqueness of steady states for a class of chemical reaction networks". Archive for Rational Mechanics and Analysis. 132 (4): 311–370. Bibcode:1995ArRMA.132..311F. doi:10.1007/BF00375614. S2CID 121416465.
- Craciun, G., Y. Tang, and M. Feinberg (June 2006). "Understanding bistability in complex enzyme-driven reaction networks". Proc Natl Acad Sci U S A. 103 (23): 8697–8702. Bibcode:2006PNAS..103.8697C. doi:10.1073/pnas.0602767103. PMC 1592242. PMID 16735474.
- Shinar, G., U. Alon and M. Feinberg (2009). "Sensitivity and robustness in chemical reaction networks". SIAM Journal on Applied Mathematics. 69 (4): 977–998. doi:10.1137/080719820.
- Shinar, G. & M. Feinberg (March 2010). "Structural sources of robustness in biochemical reaction networks". Science. 327 (5971): 1389–91. Bibcode:2010Sci...327.1389S. doi:10.1126/science.1183372. PMID 20223989. S2CID 22428321.
- Feinberg, M. & R.B. Lavine (March 1983). "Thermodynamics based on the Hahn-Banach theorem: the Clausius inequality". Archive for Rational Mechanics and Analysis. 82 (3): 203–293. Bibcode:1983ArRMA..82..203F. doi:10.1007/BF00261935. S2CID 53495319.
- Feinberg, M. and R.B. Lavine, Foundations of the Clausius-Duhem Inequality, pp. 49–64 in New Perspectives in Thermodynamics (editor James Serrin), Springer-Verlag, Berlin- Heidelberg-New York (1986).
- Feinberg, M. & R.B. Lavine (May 2024). "Entropy and Thermodynamic Temperature in Nonequilibrium Classical Thermodynamics as Immediate Consequences of the Hahn–Banach Theorem: I. Existence". Archive for Rational Mechanics and Analysis. 248. arXiv:2308.08636. doi:10.1007/s00205-024-01986-w.
- Feinberg, M. & R.B. Lavine (May 2024). "Entropy and Thermodynamic Temperature in Nonequilibrium Classical Thermodynamics as Immediate Consequences of the Hahn–Banach Theorem: II. Properties". Archive for Rational Mechanics and Analysis. 248. arXiv:2308.10676. doi:10.1007/s00205-024-01987-9.
