= Microscopic reversibility =

Concept in chemistry and physics

The principle of microscopic reversibility in physics and chemistry is twofold:

- First, it states that the microscopic detailed dynamics of particles and fields is time-reversible because the microscopic equations of motion are symmetric with respect to inversion in time (T-symmetry);
- Second, it relates to the statistical description of the kinetics of macroscopic or mesoscopic systems as an ensemble of elementary processes: collisions, elementary transitions or reactions. For these processes, the consequence of the microscopic T-symmetry is:
  Corresponding to every individual process there is a reverse process, and in a state of equilibrium the average rate of every process is equal to the average rate of its reverse process.

== History of microscopic reversibility ==
The idea of microscopic reversibility was born together with physical kinetics. In 1872, Ludwig Boltzmann represented kinetics of gases as statistical ensemble of elementary collisions. Equations of mechanics are reversible in time, hence, the reverse collisions obey the same laws. This reversibility of collisions is the first example of microreversibility. According to Boltzmann, this microreversibility implies the principle of detailed balance for collisions: at the equilibrium ensemble each collision is equilibrated by its reverse collision. These ideas of Boltzmann were analyzed in detail and generalized by Richard C. Tolman.

In chemistry, J. H. van't Hoff (1884) came up with the idea that equilibrium has dynamical nature and is a result of the balance between the forward and backward reaction rates. He did not study reaction mechanisms with many elementary reactions and could not formulate the principle of detailed balance for complex reactions. In 1901, Rudolf Wegscheider introduced the principle of detailed balance for complex chemical reactions. He found that for a complex reaction the principle of detailed balance implies important and non-trivial relations between reaction rate constants for different reactions. In particular, he demonstrated that the irreversible cycles of reaction are impossible and for the reversible cycles the product of constants of the forward reactions (in the "clockwise" direction) is equal to the product of constants of the reverse reactions (in the "anticlockwise" direction). Lars Onsager (1931) used these relations in his well-known work, without direct citation but with the following remark:

"Here, however, the chemists are accustomed to impose a very interesting additional restriction, namely: when the equilibrium is reached each individual reaction must balance itself. They require that the transition $A\to B$ must take place just as frequently as the reverse transition $B\to A$ etc."

The quantum theory of emission and absorption developed by Albert Einstein (1916, 1917) gives an example of application of the microreversibility and detailed balance to development of a new branch of kinetic theory.

Sometimes, the principle of detailed balance is formulated in the narrow sense, for chemical reactions only but in the history of physics it has the broader use: it was invented for collisions, used for emission and absorption of quanta, for transport processes and for many other phenomena.

In its modern form, the principle of microreversibility was published by Lewis (1925). In the classical textbooks full theory and many examples of applications are presented.

== Time-reversibility of dynamics ==
The Newton and the Schrödinger equations in the absence of the macroscopic magnetic fields and in the inertial frame of reference are T-invariant: if X(t) is a solution then X(-t) is also a solution (here X is the vector of all dynamic variables, including all the coordinates of particles for the Newton equations and the wave function in the configuration space for the Schrödinger equation).

There are two sources of the violation of this rule:

- First, if dynamics depend on a pseudovector like the magnetic field or the rotation angular speed in the rotating frame then the T-symmetry does not hold.
- Second, in microphysics of weak interaction the T-symmetry may be violated and only the combined CPT symmetry holds.

== Macroscopic consequences of the time-reversibility of dynamics ==
In physics and chemistry, there are two main macroscopic consequences of the time-reversibility of microscopic dynamics: the principle of detailed balance and the Onsager reciprocal relations.

The statistical description of the macroscopic process as an ensemble of the elementary indivisible events (collisions) was invented by L. Boltzmann and formalised in the Boltzmann equation. He discovered that the time-reversibility of the Newtonian dynamics leads to the detailed balance for collision: in equilibrium collisions are equilibrated by their reverse collisions. This principle allowed Boltzmann to deduce simple and nice formula for entropy production and prove his famous H-theorem. In this way, microscopic reversibility was used to prove macroscopic irreversibility and convergence of ensembles of molecules to their thermodynamic equilibria.

Another macroscopic consequence of microscopic reversibility is the symmetry of kinetic coefficients, the so-called reciprocal relations. The reciprocal relations were discovered in the 19th century by Thomson and Helmholtz for some phenomena but the general theory was proposed by Lars Onsager in 1931. He found also the connection between the reciprocal relations and detailed balance. For the equations of the law of mass action the reciprocal relations appear in the linear approximation near equilibrium as a consequence of the detailed balance conditions. According to the reciprocal relations, the damped oscillations in homogeneous closed systems near thermodynamic equilibria are impossible because the spectrum of symmetric operators is real. Therefore, the relaxation to equilibrium in such a system is monotone if it is sufficiently close to the equilibrium.

== See also ==
- Detailed balance
- Onsager reciprocal relations
