= Rudolf Wegscheider =

Austrian chemist (1859–1935)

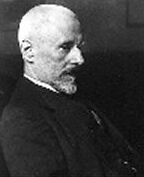
- Rudolf Wegscheider
- Born: 18 October 1859; Nagybecskerek, Kingdom of Hungary, Austrian Empire (now Zrenjanin, Serbia)
- Died: 8 January 1935 (aged 75); Vienna, Austria
- Education: University of Vienna
- Awards: Lieben Prize (1905)
- Scientific career
- Fields: Chemist
- Workplaces: University of Vienna
- Doctoral advisor: Ludwig Barth zu Barthenau

Rudolf Wegscheider (18 October 1859 – 8 January 1935) was an Austrian chemist of Banat Swabian origin. Wegscheider studied chemistry and was the founder of the Austrian School of Chemistry. He taught at the University of Vienna, and from 1902 to 1931 he was departmental Chair. He was the chairman of the association of Austrian chemists from 1904 to 1929. R. Wegscheider introduced the principle of detailed balance for chemical kinetics.

== Awards ==
- Lieben Prize, 1905
- Wilhelm Exner Medal, 1923
