= Concerted reaction =

Chemical reaction in which all bond reformation occurs in one step

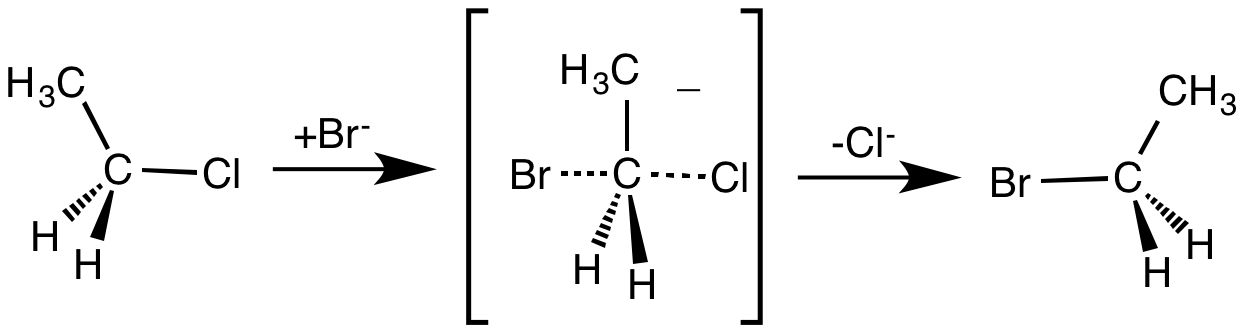
S_{N}2 reaction of a bromide ion with chloroethane showing the concerted nature of the reaction, the transition state and the predictable stereochemistry through Walden inversion.

In chemistry, a concerted reaction is a chemical reaction in which all bond breaking and bond making occurs in a single step. Reactive intermediates or other unstable high energy intermediates are not involved. Concerted reaction rates tend not to depend on solvent polarity ruling out large buildup of charge in the transition state. The reaction is said to progress through a concerted mechanism as all bonds are formed and broken in concert. Pericyclic reactions, the S_{N}2 reaction, and some rearrangements - such as the Claisen rearrangement - are concerted reactions.

The rate of the S_{N}2 reaction is second order overall due to the reaction being bimolecular (i.e. there are two molecular species involved in the rate-determining step). The reaction does not have any intermediate steps, only a transition state. This means that all the bond making and bond breaking takes place in a single step. In order for the reaction to occur both molecules must be situated correctly.
