= Lindemann mechanism =

Mechanism for unimolecular reactions

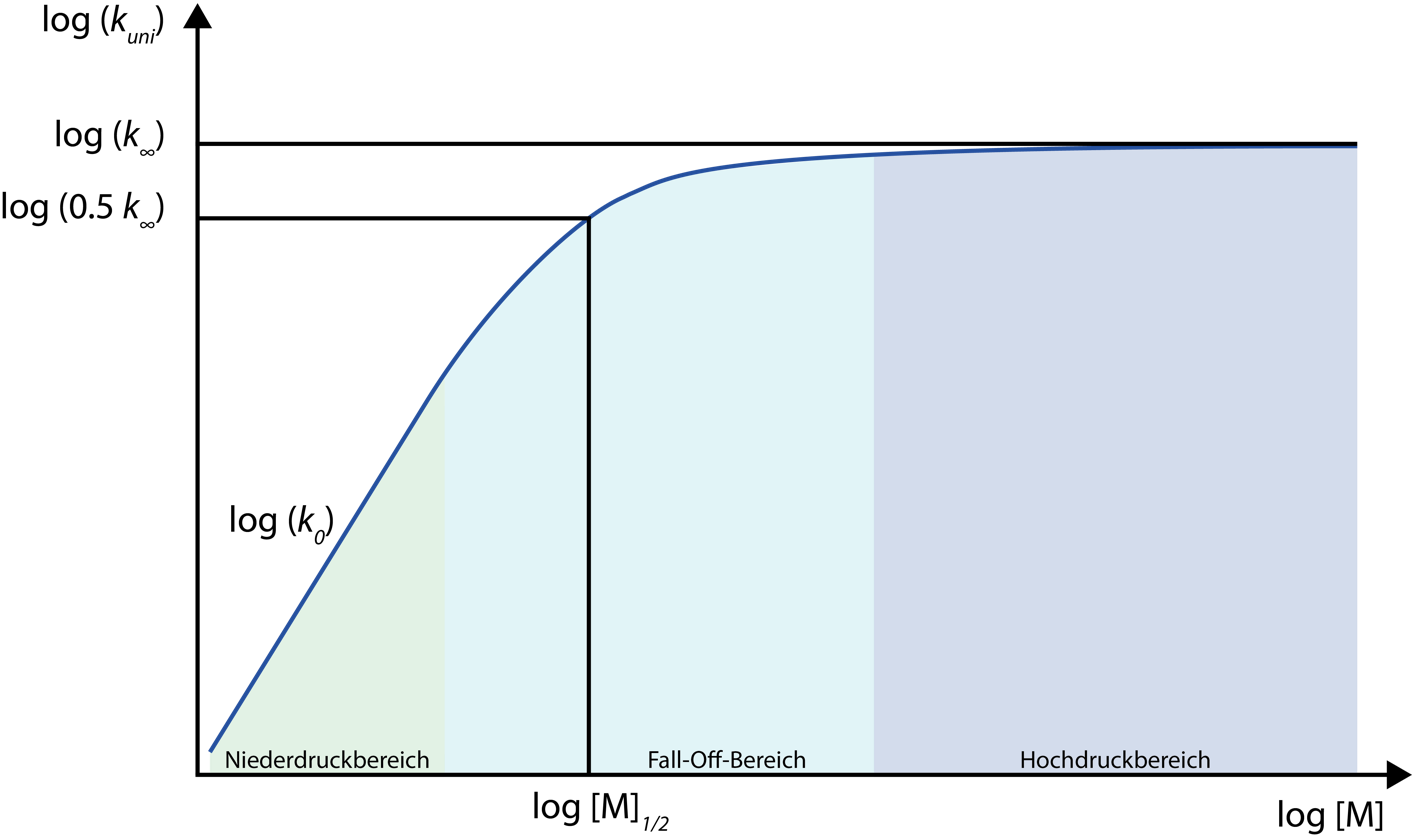
Fall-off-curve for the Lindemann mechanism.

In chemical kinetics, the Lindemann mechanism (also called the Lindemann–Christiansen mechanism or the Lindemann–Hinshelwood mechanism) is a schematic reaction mechanism for unimolecular reactions. Frederick Lindemann and J. A. Christiansen proposed the concept almost simultaneously in 1921, and Cyril Hinshelwood developed it to take into account the energy distributed among vibrational degrees of freedom for some reaction steps.

It breaks down an apparently unimolecular reaction into two elementary steps, with a rate constant for each elementary step. The rate law and rate equation for the entire reaction can be derived from the rate equations and rate constants for the two steps.

The Lindemann mechanism is used to model gas phase decomposition or isomerization reactions. Although the net formula for decomposition or isomerization appears to be unimolecular and suggests first-order kinetics in the reactant, the Lindemann mechanism shows that the unimolecular reaction step is preceded by a bimolecular activation step so that the kinetics may actually be second-order in certain cases.

== Activated reaction intermediates ==
The overall equation for a unimolecular reaction may be written A → P, where A is the initial reactant molecule and P is one or more products (one for isomerization, more for decomposition).

A Lindemann mechanism typically includes an activated reaction intermediate, labeled A*. The activated intermediate is produced from the reactant only after a sufficient activation energy is acquired by collision with a second molecule M, which may or may not be similar to A. It then either deactivates from A* back to A by another collision, or reacts in a unimolecular step to produce the product(s) P.

The two-step mechanism is then

$$\begin{align}
\ce{ {A} + M}\ & \ce{<=> {A^\ast} + M} \\
\ce{A^\ast}\ & \ce{-> P}
\end{align}$$

== Rate equation in steady-state approximation ==
The rate equation for the rate of formation of product P may be obtained by using the steady-state approximation, in which the concentration of intermediate A* is assumed constant because its rates of production and consumption are (almost) equal. This assumption simplifies the calculation of the rate equation.

For the schematic mechanism of two elementary steps above, rate constants are defined as $k_1$ for the forward reaction rate of the first step, $k_{-1}$ for the reverse reaction rate of the first step, and $k_2$ for the forward reaction rate of the second step. For each elementary step, the order of reaction is equal to the molecularity

The rate of production of the intermediate A* in the first elementary step is simply:

$\frac{\mathrm{d}[\ce A^*]}{\mathrm{d}t} = k_1 [\ce A] [\ce M]$ (forward first step)

A* is consumed both in the reverse first step and in the forward second step. The respective rates of consumption of A* are:

$-\frac{\mathrm{d}[\ce A^*]}{\mathrm{d}t} = k_{-1} [\ce A^*] [\ce M]$ (reverse first step)
$- \frac{\mathrm{d}[\ce A^*]}{\mathrm{d}t} = k_2 [\ce A^*]$ (forward second step)

According to the steady-state approximation, the rate of production of A* equals the rate of consumption. Therefore:

$$k_1 [\ce A] [\ce M] = k_{-1} [\ce A^*] [\ce M] + k_2 [\ce A^*]$$

Solving for $[\ce A^*]$, it is found that

$$[\ce A^*] = \frac{k_1 [\ce A] [\ce M]}{k_{-1} [\ce M] + k_2}$$

The overall reaction rate is

$$\frac{\mathrm{d}[\ce P]}{\mathrm{d}t} = k_2 [\ce A^*]$$

Now, by substituting the calculated value for [A*], the overall reaction rate can be expressed in terms of the original reactants A and M:

$$\frac{\mathrm{d}[\ce P]}{\mathrm{d}t} = \frac{k_1 k_2 [\ce A] [\ce M]}{k_{-1} [\ce M] + k_2}$$

== Reaction order and rate-determining step ==
The steady-state rate equation is of mixed order and predicts that a unimolecular reaction can be of either first or second order, depending on which of the two terms in the denominator is larger. At sufficiently low pressures, $k_{-1}[\ce M] \ll k_2$ so that $\mathrm{d}[\ce P]/\mathrm{d}t = k_1 [\ce A][\ce M]$, which is second order. That is, the rate-determining step is the first, bimolecular activation step.

At higher pressures, however, $k_{-1}[\ce M] \gg k_2$ so that $\frac{\mathrm{d}[\ce P]}{\mathrm{d}t} = \frac{k_1k_2}{k_{-1}}[\ce A]$ which is first order, and the rate-determining step is the second step, i.e. the unimolecular reaction of the activated molecule.

The theory can be tested by defining an effective rate constant (or coefficient) $k_{\rm uni}$ which would be constant if the reaction were first order at all pressures: $\frac{\mathrm{d}[\ce P]}{\mathrm{d}t} = k_{\rm uni}[\ce A], \quad k_{\rm uni} = \frac{1}{[A]} \frac{\mathrm{d[P]}}{\mathrm{d}t}$. The Lindemann mechanism predicts that k decreases with pressure, and that its reciprocal $\frac{1}{k}=\frac{k_{-1}}{k_1k_2}+\frac{1}{k_1[\ce M]}$ is a linear function of $\frac{1}{[\ce M]}$ or equivalently of $\frac{1}{p}$. Experimentally for many reactions, $k$ does decrease at low pressure, but the graph of $1/k$ as a function of $1/p$ is quite curved. To account accurately for the pressure-dependence of rate constants for unimolecular reactions, more elaborate theories are required such as the RRKM theory.

== Decomposition of dinitrogen pentoxide ==
In the Lindemann mechanism for a true unimolecular reaction, the activation step is followed by a single step corresponding to the formation of products. Whether this is actually true for any given reaction must be established from the evidence.

Much early experimental investigation of the Lindemann mechanism involved study of the gas-phase decomposition of dinitrogen pentoxide 2 N_{2}O_{5} → 2 N_{2}O_{4} + O_{2}. This reaction was studied by Farrington Daniels and coworkers, and initially assumed to be a true unimolecular reaction. However it is now known to be a multistep reaction whose mechanism was established by Ogg as:

N_{2}O_{5} ⇌ NO_{2} + NO_{3}
NO_{2} + NO_{3} → NO_{2} + O_{2} + NO
NO + N_{2}O_{5} → 3 NO_{2}

An analysis using the steady-state approximation shows that this mechanism can also explain the observed first-order kinetics and the fall-off of the rate constant at very low pressures.

== Mechanism of the isomerization of cyclopropane ==
The Lindemann-Hinshelwood mechanism explains unimolecular reactions that take place in the gas phase. Usually, this mechanism is used in gas phase decomposition and also in isomerization reactions. An example of isomerization by a Lindemann mechanism is the isomerization of cyclopropane.

cyclo−C_{3}H_{6} → CH_{3}−CH=CH_{2}

Although it seems like a simple reaction, it is actually a multistep reaction:

cyclo−C_{3}H_{6} → CH_{2}−CH_{2}−CH_{2} (k_{1})
CH_{2}−CH_{2}−CH_{2} → cyclo−C_{3}H_{6} (k_{−1})
CH_{2}−CH_{2}−CH_{2} → CH_{3}−CH=CH_{2} (k_{2})

This isomerization can be explained by the Lindemann mechanism, because once the cyclopropane, the reactant, is excited by collision it becomes an energized cyclopropane. And then, this molecule can be deactivated back to reactants or produce propene, the product.
