= Reaction rate =

Speed at which a chemical reaction takes place

- Common symbols: ν
- Other units: mol⋅L^{−1}⋅s^{−1}
- In SI base units: mol⋅m^{−3}⋅s^{−1}
- Dimension: L^{−3}⋅T^{−1}⋅N

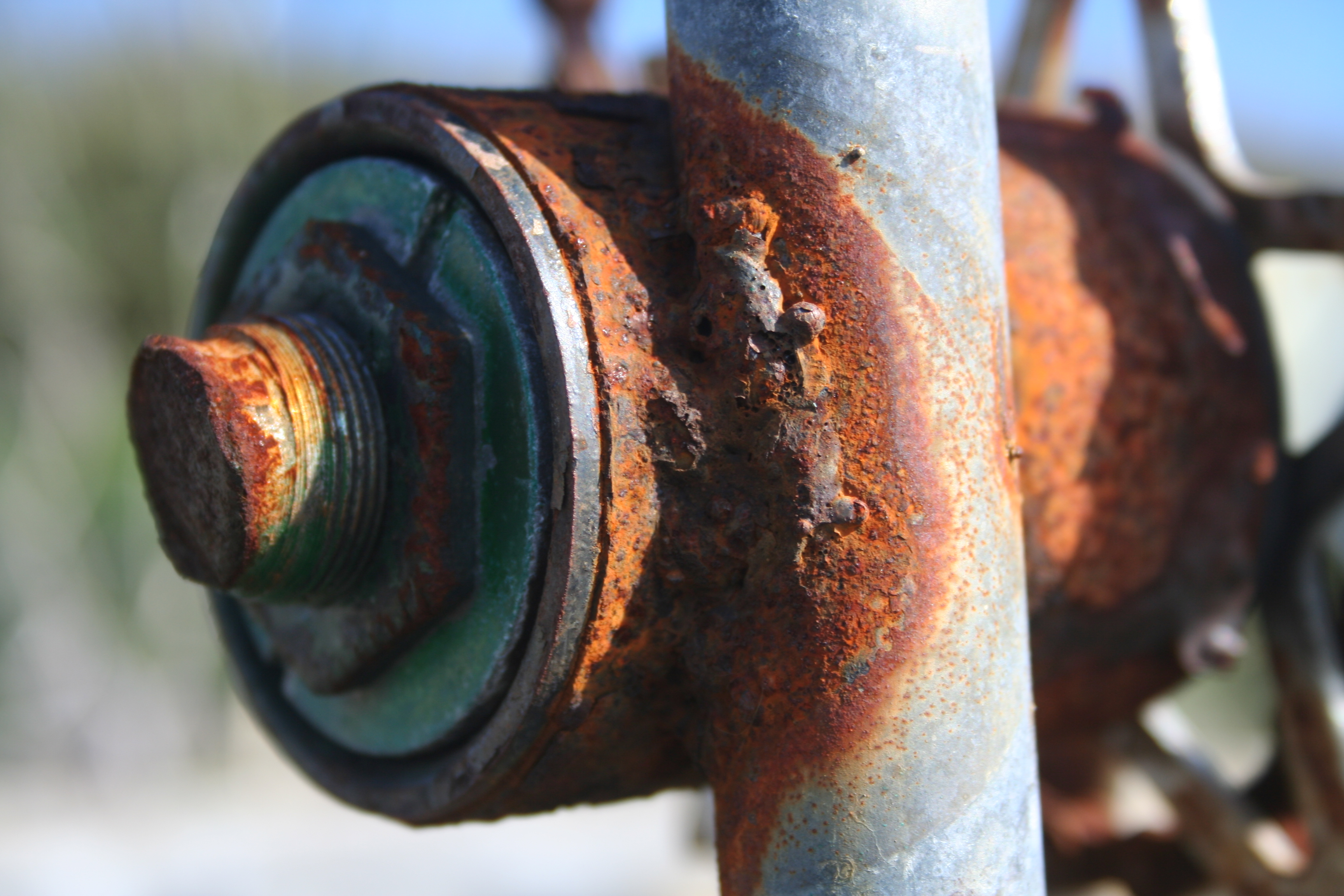
Iron rusting has a low reaction rate. This process is slow.

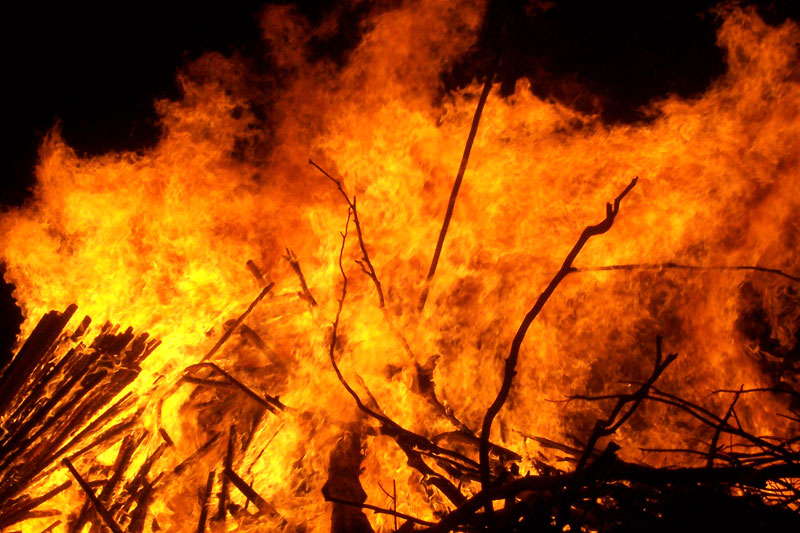
Wood combustion has a high reaction rate. This process is fast.

The reaction rate or rate of reaction is the speed at which a chemical reaction takes place, defined as proportional to the increase in the concentration of a product per unit time or to the decrease in the concentration of a reactant per unit time. Reaction rates can vary dramatically. For example, the oxidative rusting of iron under Earth's atmosphere is a slow reaction that can take many years, but the combustion of cellulose in fire is a reaction that takes place in fractions of a second. For most reactions, the rate decreases as the reaction proceeds. A reaction's rate can be determined by measuring the changes in concentration over time.

Chemical kinetics is the part of physical chemistry that concerns how rates of chemical reactions are measured and predicted, and how reaction-rate data can be used to deduce probable reaction mechanisms. The concepts of chemical kinetics are applied in many disciplines, such as chemical engineering, enzymology and environmental engineering.

== Formal definition ==
Consider a typical balanced chemical reaction:
$$\ce{\mathit{a}\, A{} + \mathit{b}\, B -> \mathit{p}\, P{} + \mathit{q}\, Q}$$

The lowercase letters (a, b, p, and q) represent stoichiometric coefficients, while the capital letters represent the reactants (A and B) and the products (P and Q).

According to IUPAC's Gold Book definition the reaction rate $\nu$ for a chemical reaction occurring in a closed system at constant volume, without a build-up of reaction intermediates, is defined as
$$\nu = -\frac{1}{a} \frac{d[\mathrm{A}]}{dt} = -\frac{1}{b} \frac{d[\mathrm{B}]}{dt} = \frac{1}{p} \frac{d[\mathrm{P}]}{dt} = \frac{1}{q} \frac{d[\mathrm{Q}]}{dt},$$
where [X] denotes the concentration of the substance X= {A, B, P, Q}. The reaction rate thus defined has the units of mol/(L⋅s).

The rate of a reaction is always positive. A negative sign is present to indicate that the reactant concentration is decreasing. The IUPAC recommends that the unit of time should always be the second. The rate of reaction differs from the rate of increase of concentration of a product P by a constant factor (the reciprocal of its stoichiometric number) and for a reactant A by minus the reciprocal of the stoichiometric number. The stoichiometric numbers are included so that the defined rate is independent of which reactant or product species is chosen for measurement. For example, if a = 1 and b = 3, then B is consumed three times more rapidly than A, but $\nu = -\tfrac{d[\mathrm{A}]}{dt} = -\tfrac{1}{3} \tfrac{d[\mathrm{B}]}{dt}$ is uniquely defined. An additional advantage of this definition is that for an elementary and irreversible reaction, $\nu$ is equal to the product of the probability of overcoming the transition state activation energy and the number of times per second the transition state is approached by reactant molecules. When so defined, for an elementary and irreversible reaction, $\nu$ is the rate of successful chemical reaction events leading to the product.

The above definition is only valid for a single reaction, in a closed system of constant volume. If water is added to a pot containing salty water, the concentration of salt decreases, although there is no chemical reaction.

For an open system, the full mass balance must be taken into account:
$$\begin{alignat}{3}
F_{\mathrm{A}_0} &- F_\mathrm{A} &&+ \displaystyle \int_0^V \nu\, dV &&= \displaystyle \frac{dN_\mathrm{A}}{dt}, \\
\text{in}        &- \text{out}   &&+ \left(\textstyle{\text{generation } - \atop \text{consumption}}\right) &&= \text{accumulation},
\end{alignat}$$
where

F_{A_{0}} is the inflow rate of A in molecules per second;
F_{A} the outflow;
$\nu$ is the instantaneous reaction rate of A (in number concentration rather than molar) in a given differential volume, integrated over the entire system volume V at a given moment.

When applied to the closed system at constant volume considered previously, this equation reduces to
$$\nu = \frac{d[A]}{dt},$$
where the concentration [A] is related to the number of molecules N_{A} by $[\mathrm A] = \tfrac{N_\mathrm{A}}{N_0 V},$ with N_{0} denoting the Avogadro constant.

For a single reaction in a closed system of varying volume, the so-called rate of conversion can be used, in order to avoid handling concentrations. It is defined as the derivative of the extent of reaction with respect to time:
$$\nu = \frac{d\xi}{dt} = \frac{1}{\nu_i} \frac{dn_i}{dt} = \frac{1}{\nu_i} \frac{d(C_i V)}{dt} = \frac{1}{\nu_i} \left(V\frac{dC_i}{dt} + C_i \frac{dV}{dt} \right),$$
where ν_{i} is the stoichiometric coefficient for substance i (equal to a, b, p, and q in the typical reaction above), V is the volume of reaction, and C_{i} is the concentration of substance i.

When side products or reaction intermediates are formed, the IUPAC recommends the use of the terms the rate of increase of concentration and rate of the decrease of concentration for products and reactants respectively.

Reaction rates may also be defined on a basis that is not the volume of the reactor. When a catalyst is used, the reaction rate may be stated on a catalyst mass [mol/(g⋅s)] or surface area [mol/(m^{2}⋅s)] basis. If the basis is a specific catalyst site that may be rigorously counted by a specified method, the rate is given in units of s^{−1} and is called a "turnover frequency".

== Influencing factors ==
Factors that influence the reaction rate are the nature of the reaction, concentration, pressure, reaction order, temperature, solvent, electromagnetic radiation, catalyst, isotopes, surface area, stirring, and diffusion limit. Some reactions are naturally faster than others. The number of reacting species, their physical state (the particles that form solids move much more slowly than those of gases or those in solution), the complexity of the reaction and other factors can greatly influence the rate of a reaction.

Reaction rate increases with concentration, as described by the rate law and explained by collision theory. As reactant concentration increases, the frequency of collision increases. The rate of gaseous reactions increases with pressure, which is, in fact, equivalent to an increase in the concentration of the gas. The reaction rate increases in the direction where there are fewer moles of gas and decreases in the reverse direction. For condensed-phase reactions, the pressure dependence is weak.

The order of the reaction controls how the reactant concentration (or pressure) affects the reaction rate.

Usually conducting a reaction at a higher temperature delivers more energy into the system and increases the reaction rate by causing more collisions between particles, as explained by collision theory. However, the main reason that temperature increases the rate of reaction is that more of the colliding particles will have the necessary activation energy resulting in more successful collisions (when bonds are formed between reactants). The influence of temperature is described by the Arrhenius equation. For example, coal burns in a fireplace in the presence of oxygen, but it does not when it is stored at room temperature. The reaction is spontaneous at high temperatures but at room temperature, its rate is so slow that it is negligible. The increase in temperature, as created by a match, allows the reaction to start and then it heats itself because it is exothermic. That is valid for many other fuels, such as methane, butane, and hydrogen.

Reaction rates can be independent of temperature (non-Arrhenius) or decrease with increasing temperature (anti-Arrhenius). Reactions without an activation barrier (for example, some radical reactions), tend to have anti-Arrhenius temperature dependence: the rate constant decreases with increasing temperature.

Many reactions take place in solution and the properties of the solvent affect the reaction rate. The ionic strength also has an effect on the reaction rate.

Electromagnetic radiation is a form of energy. As such, it may speed up the rate or even make a reaction spontaneous as it provides the particles of the reactants with more energy. This energy is in one way or another stored in the reacting particles (it may break bonds, and promote molecules to electronically or vibrationally excited states...) creating intermediate species that react easily. As the intensity of light increases, the particles absorb more energy and hence the rate of reaction increases. For example, when methane reacts with chlorine in the dark, the reaction rate is slow. It can be sped up when the mixture is put under diffused light. In bright sunlight, the reaction is explosive.

The presence of a catalyst increases the reaction rate (in both the forward and reverse reactions) by providing an alternative pathway with a lower activation energy. For example, platinum catalyzes the combustion of hydrogen with oxygen at room temperature.

The kinetic isotope effect consists of a different reaction rate for the same molecule if it has different isotopes, usually hydrogen isotopes, because of the relative mass difference between hydrogen and deuterium. In reactions on surfaces, which take place, for example, during heterogeneous catalysis, the rate of reaction increases as the surface area does. That is because more particles of the solid are exposed and can be hit by reactant molecules.

Stirring can have a strong effect on the rate of reaction for heterogeneous reactions.

Some reactions are limited by diffusion. All the factors that affect a reaction rate, except for concentration and reaction order, are taken into account in the reaction rate coefficient (the coefficient in the rate equation of the reaction).

== Rate equation ==
For a chemical reaction aA + bB → pP + qQ, the rate equation or rate law is a mathematical expression used in chemical kinetics to link the rate of a reaction to the concentration of each reactant. For a closed system at constant volume, this is often of the form
$$v = k [\mathrm{A}]^{n}[\mathrm{B}]^{m} - k_r[\mathrm{P}]^{i}[\mathrm{Q}]^{j}.$$

For reactions that go to completion (which implies very small k_{r}), or if only the initial rate is analyzed (with initial vanishing product concentrations), this simplifies to the commonly quoted form

$$v = k(T)[\mathrm{A}]^{n}[\mathrm{B}]^{m}.$$

For gas phase reaction the rate equation is often alternatively expressed in terms of partial pressures.

In these equations k(T) is the reaction rate coefficient or rate constant, although it is not really a constant, because it includes all the parameters that affect reaction rate, except for time and concentration. Of all the parameters influencing reaction rates, temperature is normally the most important one and is accounted for by the Arrhenius equation.

The exponents n and m are called reaction orders and depend on the reaction mechanism. For an elementary (single-step) reaction, the order with respect to each reactant is equal to its stoichiometric coefficient. For complex (multistep) reactions, however, this is often not true and the rate equation is determined by the detailed mechanism, as illustrated below for the reaction of H_{2} and NO.

For elementary reactions or reaction steps, the order and stoichiometric coefficient are both equal to the molecularity or number of molecules participating. For a unimolecular reaction or step, the rate is proportional to the concentration of molecules of reactant, so the rate law is first order. For a bimolecular reaction or step, the number of collisions is proportional to the product of the two reactant concentrations, or second order. A termolecular step is predicted to be third order, but also very slow as simultaneous collisions of three molecules are rare.

By using the mass balance for the system in which the reaction occurs, an expression for the rate of change in concentration can be derived. For a closed system with constant volume, such an expression can look like

$$\frac{d[\mathrm{P}]}{dt} = k(T)[\mathrm{A}]^n [\mathrm{B}]^m.$$

=== Example of a complex reaction: hydrogen and nitric oxide ===
For the reaction

$$\ce{2H2_{(g)}} + \ce{2NO_{(g)} -> N2_{(g)}} + \ce{2H2O_{(g)}},$$

the observed rate equation (or rate expression) is
$$v = k [\ce{H2}] [\ce{NO}]^2.$$

As for many reactions, the experimental rate equation does not simply reflect the stoichiometric coefficients in the overall reaction: It is third order overall: first order in H_{2} and second order in NO, even though the stoichiometric coefficients of both reactants are equal to 2.

In chemical kinetics, the overall reaction rate is often explained using a mechanism consisting of a number of elementary steps. Not all of these steps affect the rate of reaction; normally the slowest elementary step controls the reaction rate. For this example, a possible mechanism is

$$\begin{array}{rll}
1) & \quad \ce{2NO_{(g)} <=> N2O2_{(g)}} & (\text{fast equilibrium}) \\
2) & \quad \ce{N2O2 + H2 -> N2O + H2O} & (\text{slow}) \\
3) & \quad \ce{N2O + H2 -> N2 + H2O} & (\text{fast}).
\end{array}$$

Reactions 1 and 3 are very rapid compared to the second, so the slow reaction 2 is the rate-determining step. This is a bimolecular elementary reaction whose rate is given by the second-order equation
$$v = k_2 [\ce{H2}] [\ce{N2O2}] ,$$
where k_{2} is the rate constant for the second step.

However N_{2}O_{2} is an unstable intermediate whose concentration is determined by the fact that the first step is in equilibrium, so that $\ce{[N2O2] = \mathit{K}_1[NO]^2},$ where K_{1} is the equilibrium constant of the first step. Substitution of this equation in the previous equation leads to a rate equation expressed in terms of the original reactants
$$v = k_2 K_1 [\ce{H2}] [\ce{NO}]^2 \,.$$

This agrees with the form of the observed rate equation if it is assumed that k = k_{2}K_{1}. In practice the rate equation is used to suggest possible mechanisms which predict a rate equation in agreement with experiment.

The second molecule of H_{2} does not appear in the rate equation because it reacts in the third step, which is a rapid step after the rate-determining step, so that it does not affect the overall reaction rate.

== Temperature dependence ==
Each reaction rate coefficient k has a temperature dependency, which is usually given by the Arrhenius equation:
$$k = A \exp\left(-\frac{E_\text{a}}{RT} \right),$$
where

A, is the pre-exponential factor, or frequency factor,
exp is the exponential function,
E_{a} is the activation energy,
R is the gas constant.

Since at temperature T the molecules have energies given by a Boltzmann distribution, one can expect the number of collisions with energy greater than E_{a} to be proportional to $\exp\left(\tfrac{-E_\text{a}}{RT}\right)$.

The values for A and E_{a} are dependent on the reaction. There are also more complex equations possible, which describe the temperature dependence of other rate constants that do not follow this pattern.

Temperature is a measure of the average kinetic energy of the reactants. As temperature increases, the kinetic energy of the reactants increases. That is, the particles move faster, which allows more collisions to take place and at a greater speed, so the chance of reactants forming into products increases, which in turn results in the rate of reaction increasing. As a rule of thumb, a rise of ten degrees Celsius results in approximately twice the reaction rate constant.

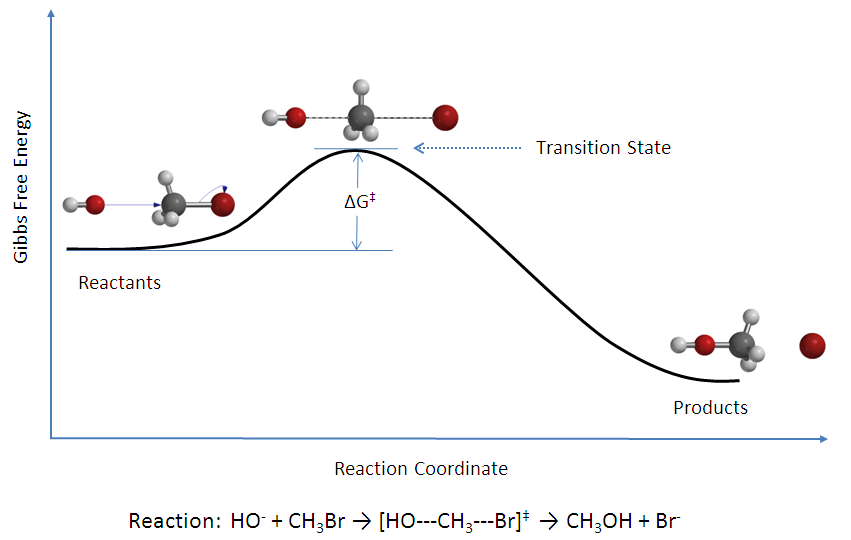
Reaction coordinate diagram for the bimolecular nucleophilic substitution (S_{N}2) reaction between bromomethane and the hydroxide anion

The minimum kinetic energy required for a reaction to occur is called the activation energy and is denoted by E_{a} or ΔG^{‡}. The transition state or activated complex shown on the diagram is the energy barrier that must be overcome when changing reactants into products. The molecules with an energy greater than this barrier have enough energy to react.

For a successful collision to take place, the collision geometry must be right, meaning the reactant molecules must face the right way, so the activated complex can be formed.

A chemical reaction takes place only when the reacting particles collide. However, not all collisions are effective in causing the reaction. Products are formed only when the colliding particles possess a certain minimum energy called threshold energy. For a given reaction, the ratio of its rate constant at a higher temperature to its rate constant at a lower temperature is known as its temperature coefficient (Q). Q_{10} is commonly used as the ratio of rate constants that are 10 °C apart and is usually on the order of 2.

== Pressure dependence ==
The pressure dependence of the rate constant for condensed-phase reactions (that is, when reactants and products are solids or liquid) is usually sufficiently weak in the range of pressures normally encountered in industry that it is neglected in practice.

The pressure dependence of the rate constant is associated with the activation volume. For the reaction proceeding through an activation-state complex,
$$\ce{A + B <=>} \ |\ce{A} \cdots \ce{B}|^\ddagger \ \ce{-> P},$$
the activation volume ΔV^{‡} is
$$\Delta V^\ddagger = \bar{V}_\ddagger - \bar{V}_\mathrm{A} - \bar{V}_\mathrm{B},$$
where V̅ denotes the partial molar volume of a species, and ‡ (a double dagger) indicates the activation-state complex.

For the above reaction, one can expect the change of the reaction rate constant (based either on mole fraction or on molar concentration) with pressure at constant temperature to be
$$\left(\frac{\partial \ln k_x}{\partial P}\right)_T = -\frac{\Delta V^\ddagger}{RT}.$$
In practice, the matter can be complicated because the partial molar volumes and the activation volume can themselves depend on pressure.

Reactions can increase or decrease their rates with pressure, depending on the value of ΔV^{‡}. As an example of the possible magnitude of the pressure effect, some organic reactions were shown to double the reaction rate when the pressure was increased from atmospheric (0.1 MPa) to 50 MPa (which gives ΔV^{‡} = −0.025 L/mol).

== See also ==
- Diffusion-controlled reaction
- Dilution (equation)
- Isothermal microcalorimetry
- Rate of solution
- Steady state approximation
