= Evgeny E. Nikitin =

Evgenii Evgenevich Nikitin (Russian: Евгений Евгеньевич Никитин, German: Jewgeni Jewgenjewitsch Nikitin; born 9 May 1933 in Saratov, Russia) is a Russian theoretical chemist and emeritus professor at the Technion in Haifa, Israel.

== Education ==
Nikitin studied physics at Saratov State University from 1950 to 1955. Later he moved to the Institute for Chemical Physics at The Academy of Sciences of the USSR Moscow where he earned his doctorate in 1965. From 1965 to 1991 he was Professor at the Institute for Chemical Physics and the Moscow Institute of Physics and Technology. In 1992 he went to the Technion – Israel Institute of Technology, where he became Emeritus professor in 2002. Since 2002 he has been guest professor at the Max Planck Institute for Biophysical Chemistry in Göttingen.

His field of work is the theoretical description of Elementary reactions with quantum theoretical methods, especially by using different quantum mechanical approximations. He is particularly well known for his investigations of non-adiabatic electronic effects in dynamic and kinetic chemical reactions, in other words, effects that cannot be described in the Born–Oppenheimer approximation. Nikitin has published more than 300 scientific works in journals as well as several specialist books, some of which have only been published in Russian.

He has received many awards and honors. In 1977 he became a member of the Leopoldina. Since 2012 he has been a corresponding member of the Göttingen Academy of Sciences and Humanities. In 1987 he became a member of the International Academy of Quantum Molecular Science.

== Works (selection) ==
- Nikitin, E. E. (1965). "Nonadiabatic transitions between fine-structure components of alkali atoms upon collision with inert-gas atoms". The Journal of Chemical Physics. 43 (2): 744–750. Bibcode:1965JChPh..43..744N. doi:10.1063/1.1696800.
- Theory of Elementary Atomic and Molecular Processes in Gases. Clarendon Press. 1974. p. 472.
- Selected Topics of the Theory of Chemical Elementary Processes. Lecture Notes in Chemistry. Springer. 1978. ISBN 978-3-540-08768-7.
- Theory of Slow Atomic Collisions. Springer Series in Chemical Physics. Springer. 1984. ISBN 978-3-642-82047-2.
- Nikitin, E. E. (1999). "Nonadiabatic transitions: What we learned from old masters and how much we owe them". Annual Review of Physical Chemistry. 50 (1): 1–21. Bibcode:1999ARPC...50....1N. doi:10.1146/annurev.physchem.50.1.1. PMID 15012404.
- Nikitin, E. E.; Troe, J. (2008). "70 years of Landau-Teller theory for collisional energy transfer. Semiclassical three-dimensional generalizations of the classical collinear model". Physical Chemistry Chemical Physics (Incorporating Faraday Transactions). 10 (11): 1483–1501. Bibcode:2008PCCP...10.1483N. doi:10.1039/B715095D. hdl:11858/00-001M-0000-0012-DDDD-C. PMID 18327304.
