= Product-determining step =

The product-determining step is the step of a chemical reaction that determines the ratio of products formed via differing reaction mechanisms that start from the same reactants. The product determining step is not rate limiting if the rate limiting step of each mechanism is the same.

== See also ==
- Rate-determining step
