= Crossed molecular beam =

Method of producing and studying chemical reactions

In analytical chemistry, crossed molecular beam experiments involve two beams of atoms or molecules which are collided together to study the dynamics of the chemical reaction, and can detect individual reactive collisions.

== Technique ==
In a crossed molecular beam apparatus, two collimated beams of gas-phase atoms or molecules, each dilute enough to ignore collisions within each beam, intersect in a vacuum chamber. The direction and velocity of the resulting product molecules are then measured, and are frequently coupled with mass spectrometric data. These data yield information about the partitioning of energy among translational, rotational, and vibrational modes of the product molecules.

== History ==
The crossed molecular beam technique was developed by Dudley Herschbach and Yuan T. Lee, for which they were awarded the 1986 Nobel Prize in Chemistry. While the technique was demonstrated in 1953 by Taylor and Datz of Oak Ridge National Laboratory, Herschbach and Lee refined the apparatus and began probing gas-phase reactions in unprecedented detail.

Early crossed beam experiments investigated alkali metals such as potassium, rubidium, and cesium. When the scattered alkali metal atoms collided with a hot metal filament, they ionized, creating a small electric current. Because this detection method is nearly perfectly efficient, the technique was quite sensitive. Unfortunately, this simple detection system only detects alkali metals. New techniques for detection were needed to analyze main group elements.

Detecting scattered particles through a metal filament gave a good indication of angular distribution but has no sensitivity to kinetic energy. In order to gain insight into the kinetic energy distribution, early crossed molecular beam apparatuses used a pair of slotted disks placed between the collision center and the detector. By controlling the rotation speed of the disks, only particles with a certain known velocity could pass through and be detected. With information about the velocity, angular distribution, and identity of the scattered species, useful information about the dynamics of the system can be derived.

Later improvements included the use of quadrupole mass filters to select only the products of interest, as well as time-of-flight mass spectrometers to allow easy measurement of kinetic energy. These improvements also allowed the detection of a vast array of compounds, marking the advent of the "universal" crossed molecular beam apparatus.

The inclusion of supersonic nozzles to collimate the gases expanded the variety and scope of experiments, and the use of lasers to excite the beams (either before impact or at the point of reaction) further broadened the applicability of this technique.

== See also ==
- Molecularity
