= Petersen matrix =

The Petersen matrix is a comprehensive description of systems of biochemical reactions used to model reactors for pollution control (engineered decomposition) as well as in environmental systems. It has as many columns as the number of relevant involved components (chemicals, pollutants, biomasses, gases) and as many rows as the number of involved processes (biochemical reactions and physical degradation). One further column is added to host the description of the kinetics of each transformation (rate equation).

== Matrix structure ==
The mass conservation principle for each process is expressed in the rows of the matrix. If all components are included (none omitted) then the mass conservation principle states that, for each process:

$$\text{for all process } i:\sum_{j=1}^n a_{ij} \dot{\rho_j} = 0 \;,$$

where $\dot{\rho_j}$ is the density rate of each component. This can also be seen as the process stoichiometric relation.

Moreover, the rate of variation of each component for all processes simultaneous effect can be easily assessed by summing the columns:

$$\text{for all component } j: \frac{\partial C_j}{\partial t} = \sum_{i=1}^m a_{ij} r_i \; ,$$

where $r_i$ are the reaction rates of each process.

== Example ==
A system of a third order reaction followed by a Michaelis–Menten enzyme reaction.

$$\ce{{A} + 2B -> S}$$
$$\ce{{E} + S <=>[k_f][k_r] ES ->[k_\mathrm{cat}] {E} + P}$$

where the reagents A and B combine forming the substrate S (S = AB_{2}), which with the help of enzyme E is transformed into the product P. Production rates for each substance is:

$$\begin{align}
\frac{d [\ce A]}{d t} &= -k_1[\ce A][\ce B]^2
\\[6pt]
\frac{d [\ce B]}{d t} &= -2 k_1[\ce A][\ce B]^2
\\[6pt]
\frac{d [\ce S]}{d t} &= k_1[\ce A][\ce B]^2 - k_f[\ce E][\ce S] + k_r[\ce{ES}]
\\[6pt]
\frac{d [\ce E]}{d t} &= - k_f[\ce E][\ce S] + k_r[\ce{ES}] + k_\ce{cat}[\ce ES]
\\[6pt]
\frac{d [\ce ES]}{d t} &= k_f[\ce E][\ce S] - k_r[\ce{ES}] - k_\ce{cat}[\ce{ES}]
\\[6pt]
\frac{d [\ce P]}{d t} &= k_\ce{cat}[\ce ES]
\end{align}$$

Therefore, the Petersen matrix reads as

Components (kmol/m³) Process	A	B	S	E	ES	P	Reaction rate
P1: 2nd order formation of S from A and B	−1	−2	+1	0	0	0	$k_1[\ce A][\ce B]^2$
P2: Formation of ES from E and S	0	0	−1	−1	+1	0	$k_f[\ce E][\ce S]$
P3: Back decomposition of ES into E and S	0	0	+1	+1	−1	0	$k_r[\ce{ES}]$
P4: Forward decomposition of ES into E and P	0	0	0	+1	−1	+1	$k_\ce{cat}[\ce{ES}]$

The Petersen matrix can be used to write the system's rate equation

$$\begin{pmatrix}
\frac{d}{d t}[\ce A] \\
\frac{d}{d t}[\ce B] \\
\frac{d}{d t}[\ce S] \\
\frac{d}{d t}[\ce E] \\
\frac{d}{d t}[\ce{ES}] \\
\frac{d}{d t}[\ce P]
\end{pmatrix}
=
\begin{bmatrix}
-1 & 0 & 0 & 0  \\
-2 & 0 & 0 & 0  \\
+1 & -1 & +1 & 0  \\
0 & -1 & +1 & +1  \\
0 & +1 & -1 & -1  \\
0 & 0 & 0 & +1
\end{bmatrix}
\begin{pmatrix}
k_1[\ce A][\ce B]^2 \\
k_f[\ce E][\ce S] \\
k_r[\ce{ES}] \\
k_\ce{cat}[\ce{ES}]
\end{pmatrix}$$
