= Hot atom =

In physical chemistry, a hot atom is an atom that has a high kinetic or internal energy.

When molecule AB adsorbs on a surface dissociatively,

1. both A and B adsorb on the surface, or
2. only A adsorbs on the surface, and B desorbs from the surface.

In case 2, B gains a high translational energy from the adsorption energy of A, and hot atom B is generated. For example, the hydrogen molecule, because of its light mass, gets a high translational energy. Such a hot atom does not fly into vacuum but is trapped on the surface, where it diffuses with high energy.

Hot atoms are expected to play important roles in catalytic reactions. For example, a reaction of a hydrogen atom with hydrogen atoms on a silicon surface and a reaction of an oxygen atom with oxygen molecules on Pt(111) have been reported. Hot atoms can also be generated by degenerating molecules on a metal surface with UV light. It has been reported that the reactivity of an oxygen atom generated in such a way on a platinum surface is different from that of chemisorbed oxygen atoms. Elucidating the role of hot atoms on surfaces will lead to a deeper understanding of the mechanism of reactions.

== See also ==
- Reactions on surfaces
