= Elementary reaction =

Chemical reaction with a single step and transition state

An elementary reaction is a chemical reaction in which one or more chemical species react directly to form products in a single reaction step and with a single transition state. In practice, a reaction is assumed to be elementary if no reaction intermediates have been detected or need to be postulated to describe the reaction on a molecular scale. An apparently elementary reaction may be in fact a stepwise reaction, i.e. a complicated sequence of chemical reactions, with reaction intermediates of variable lifetimes.

In a unimolecular elementary reaction, a molecule A dissociates or isomerises to form the products(s)

$$\mbox{A} \rightarrow \mbox{products.}$$

At constant temperature, the rate of such a reaction is proportional to the concentration of the species A

$$\frac{d[\mbox{A}]}{dt}=-k[\mbox{A}].$$

In a bimolecular elementary reaction, two atoms, molecules, ions or radicals, A and B, react together to form the product(s)

$$\mbox{A + B} \rightarrow \mbox{products.}$$

The rate of such a reaction, at constant temperature, is proportional to the product of the concentrations of the species A and B

$$\frac{d[\mbox{A}]}{dt}=\frac{d[\mbox{B}]}{dt}=-k[\mbox{A}][\mbox{B}].$$

The rate expression for an elementary bimolecular reaction is sometimes referred to as the law of mass action as it was first proposed by Cato Maximilian Guldberg and Peter Waage in 1864. An example of this type of reaction is a cycloaddition reaction. This rate expression can be derived from first principles by using collision theory for ideal gases. For the case of dilute fluids equivalent results have been obtained from simple probabilistic arguments.

According to collision theory the probability of three chemical species reacting simultaneously with each other in a termolecular elementary reaction is negligible. Hence such termolecular reactions are commonly referred as non-elementary reactions and can be broken down into a more fundamental set of bimolecular reactions, in agreement with the law of mass action. It is not always possible to derive overall reaction schemes, but solutions based on rate equations are often possible in terms of steady-state or Michaelis-Menten approximations.
