= Molecularity =

Number of molecules that participate in a single-step reaction

In chemistry, molecularity is the number of molecules that come together to react in an elementary (single-step) reaction and is equal to the sum of stoichiometric coefficients of reactants in the elementary reaction with effective collision (sufficient energy) and correct orientation. Depending on how many molecules come together, a reaction can be unimolecular, bimolecular or even trimolecular.

The kinetic order of any elementary reaction or reaction step is equal to its molecularity, and the rate equation of an elementary reaction can therefore be determined by inspection, from the molecularity.

The kinetic order of a complex (multistep) reaction, however, is not necessarily equal to the number of molecules involved. The concept of molecularity is only useful to describe elementary reactions or steps.

== Unimolecular reactions ==
In a unimolecular reaction, a single molecule rearranges atoms, forming different molecules. This is illustrated by the equation

$$\ce{A -> P,}$$

where $\rm P$ refers to chemical product(s). The reaction or reaction step is an isomerization if there is only one product molecule, or a dissociation if there is more than one product molecule.

In either case, the rate of the reaction or step is described by the first order rate law

$$\frac{d \left [ \ce A \right ]}{dt} =  -k_r  \left [ \ce A \right ] ,$$

where $[\rm A]$ is the concentration of species A, $t$ is time, and $k_r$ is the reaction rate constant.

As can be deduced from the rate law equation, the number of A molecules that decay is proportional to the number of A molecules available. An example of a unimolecular reaction, is the isomerization of cyclopropane to propene:

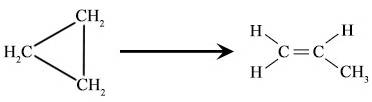

Unimolecular reactions can be explained by the Lindemann-Hinshelwood mechanism.

== Bimolecular reactions ==
In a bimolecular reaction, two molecules collide and exchange energy, atoms or groups of atoms.

This can be described by the equation

$\ce{A + B -> P}$

which corresponds to the second order rate law: $\frac {d[\ce A]}{dt} = -k_r \ce{[A][B]}$.

Here, the rate of the reaction is proportional to the rate at which the reactants come together. An example of a bimolecular reaction is the S_{N}2-type nucleophilic substitution of methyl bromide by hydroxide ion:

$\ce{CH3Br + OH^- -> CH3OH + Br^-}$

== Termolecular reactions ==
A termolecular (or trimolecular) reaction in solutions or gas mixtures involves three reactants simultaneously colliding, with appropriate orientation and sufficient energy. However the term trimolecular is also used to refer to three body association reactions of the type:

$\ce{A + B ->[\ce{M}] C}$

Where the M over the arrow denotes that to conserve energy and momentum a second reaction with a third body is required. After the initial bimolecular collision of A and B an energetically excited reaction intermediate is formed, then, it collides with a M body, in a second bimolecular reaction, transferring the excess energy to it.

The reaction can be explained as two consecutive reactions:

$\ce{A + B -> AB}^*$ $\ce{AB}^*\ce{ + M -> C + M}$

These reactions frequently have a pressure and temperature dependence region of transition between second and third order kinetics.

Catalytic reactions are often three-component, but in practice a complex of the starting materials is first formed and the rate-determining step is the reaction of this complex into products, not an adventitious collision between the two species and the catalyst. For example, in hydrogenation with a metal catalyst, molecular dihydrogen first dissociates onto the metal surface into hydrogen atoms bound to the surface, and it is these monatomic hydrogens that react with the starting material, also previously adsorbed onto the surface.

Reactions of higher molecularity are not observed due to very small probability of simultaneous interaction between 4 or more molecules.

== Difference between molecularity and order of reaction ==
It is important to distinguish molecularity from order of reaction. The order of reaction is an empirical quantity determined by experiment from the rate law of the reaction. It is the sum of the exponents in the rate law equation. Molecularity, on the other hand, is deduced from the mechanism of an elementary reaction, and is used only in context of an elementary reaction. It is the number of molecules taking part in this reaction.

This difference can be illustrated on the reaction between nitric oxide and hydrogen:

$\ce{2NO + 2H2 -> N2 + 2H2O,}$

where the observed rate law is $v = k\ce{[NO]^2[H2]}$, so that the reaction is third order. Since the order does not equal the sum of reactant stoichiometric coefficients, the reaction must involve more than one step. The proposed two-step mechanism has a rate-limiting first step whose molecularity corresponds to the overall order of 3:

Slow: $\ce{2 NO + H2 -> N2 + H2O2}$ Fast: $\ce{H2O2 + H2 -> 2H2O}$

On the other hand, the molecularity of this reaction is undefined, because it involves a mechanism of more than one step. However, we can consider the molecularity of the individual elementary reactions that make up this mechanism: the first step is trimolecular because it involves three reactant molecules, while the second step is bimolecular because it involves two reactant molecules.

== See also ==
- Reaction rate
- Dissociation (chemistry)
- Lindemann mechanism
- Crossed molecular beam
- Cage effect
- Reaction progress kinetic analysis
