= Reaction step =

Part of a multi-step chemical reaction

In chemistry, a reaction step of a chemical reaction is defined as: "An elementary reaction, constituting one of the stages of a stepwise reaction in which a reaction intermediate (or, for the first step, the reactants) is converted into the next reaction intermediate (or, for the last step, the products) in the sequence of intermediates between reactants and products". To put it simply, it is an elementary reaction which goes from one reaction intermediate to another or to the final product.

The mechanism of a given reaction is the sequence of steps involved in the reaction. For different reactions, the sequences vary greatly in complexity. An elementary reaction consists of a single step. Other reactions can have mechanisms of several consecutive steps; the examples in the article on Reaction mechanism have as many as six. Also more complicated mechanisms exist such as chain reaction which include a repeating cycle of steps in a chain propagation.

== Related articles ==
- Rate-determining step
- Reaction mechanism
- Reaction coordinate
- Concerted reaction
