= Reaction intermediate =

Molecular entity formed as an elementary step in a multi-step chemical reaction

In chemistry, a reaction intermediate, or intermediate, is a molecular entity arising within the sequence of a stepwise chemical reaction. It is formed as the reaction product of an elementary step, from the reactants and/or preceding intermediates, but is consumed in a later step. It does not appear in the chemical equation for the overall reaction. For example, consider this hypothetical reaction:

A + B → C + D

If this overall reaction comprises two elementary steps thus:

A + B → X
X → C + D

then X is a reaction intermediate.

The phrase reaction intermediate is often abbreviated to the single word intermediate, and this is IUPAC's preferred form of the term.

In most non-biological cases, a reaction intermediate is also a reactive intermediate: a short-lived, high-energy species too reactive for isolation. When generated in a chemical reaction, it will quickly convert into a more stable molecule. Only in exceptional cases can these compounds be isolated and stored, e.g. low temperatures, matrix isolation. Instead, reactive intermediates are only observable through fast spectroscopic methods. When their existence is indicated, reactive intermediates can help explain how a chemical reaction takes place.

== IUPAC definition ==
The IUPAC Gold Book defines an intermediate as a compound that has a lifetime greater than a molecular vibration, is formed (directly or indirectly) from the reactants, and reacts further to give (either directly or indirectly) the products of a chemical reaction. The lifetime condition distinguishes true, chemically distinct intermediates, both from vibrational states and from transition states (which, by definition, have lifetimes close to that of molecular vibration).

The different steps of a multi-step reaction often differ widely in their reaction rates. Where the difference is significant, an intermediate consumed more quickly than another may be described as a relative intermediate.

A reactive intermediate is one which due to its short lifetime does not remain in the product mixture. Reactive intermediates are usually high-energy, are unstable and are seldom isolated.

== Common reactive intermediates ==
Reactive intermediates have several features in common:

- low concentration with respect to reaction substrate and final reaction product
- with the exception of carbanions, these intermediates do not obey the Lewis octet rule, hence the high reactivity
- often generated on chemical decomposition of a chemical compound
- it is often possible to prove the existence of this species by spectroscopic means
- cage effects have to be taken into account
- often stabilisation by conjugation or resonance
- often difficult to distinguish from a transition state
- prove existence by means of chemical trapping
Radical

Carbene

Carbocation

Carbanion

Carbyne

Benzyne (an aryne)

=== Carbocations ===
Cations, often carbocations, serve as intermediates in electrophilic addition to alkenes, S_{N}1 substitutions, and E1 eliminations. For example, in an HX addition reaction, the pi bond of an alkene acts as a nucleophile and bonds with the proton of an HX molecule, where the X is a halogen atom. This forms a carbocation intermediate, and the X then bonds to the positive carbon that is available, as in the following two-step reaction.

CH_{2}CH_{2} + HX → CH_{3}CH^{+}_{2} + X^{−}

CH_{3}CH^{+}_{2} + X^{−} → CH_{3}CH_{2}X

The reverse process is precisely E1 elimination:

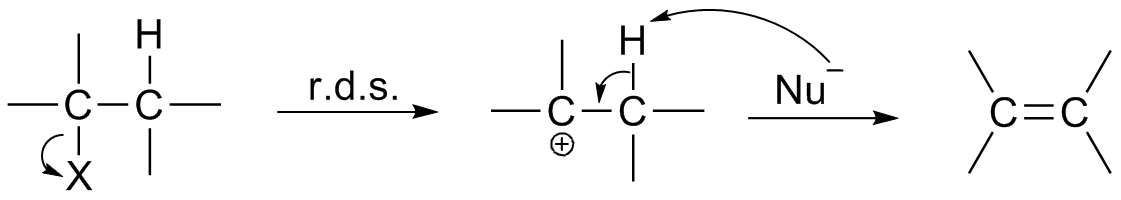

=== Carbanions ===
A carbanion is an organic molecule where a carbon atom is not electron deficient but contain an overall negative charge. Carboanions are strong nucleophiles, which can be used to extend an alkene's carbon backbone in the synthesis reaction shown below.

C_{2}H_{2} with NaNH_{2} in NH_{3}(l) → CHC^{−}

CHC^{−} + BrCH_{2}CH_{3} → CHC−CH_{2}CH_{3}

The alkyne carbanion, CHC^{−}, is a reaction intermediate in this reaction.

=== Radicals ===
Radicals are highly reactive and short-lived, as they have an unpaired electron which makes them extremely unstable. Radicals often react with hydrogens attached to carbon molecules, effectively making the carbon a radical while stabilizing the former radical in a process called propagation. The formed product, a carbon radical, can react with non-radical molecule to continue propagation or react with another radical to form a new stable molecule such as a longer carbon chain or an alkyl halide.

=== Other reactive intermediates ===
- Carbenoid
- Ion-neutral complex
- Keto anions
- Nitrenes
- Oxocarbenium ions
- Phosphinidenes
- Phosphoryl nitride
- Tetrahedral intermediates in carbonyl addition reactions

== Biological intermediates ==
In the biological context, reaction intermediates typically are stable molecules; reactions occur through enzymatic catalysis and uncontrolled reactivity would lead to cell damage. Investigation of the intermediates in reaction pathways can help understand cellular signaling and catalysis mechanisms. For example, bacteria acquire resistance to β-lactam antibiotics such as penicillin through the enzyme metallo-β-lactamase. Spectroscopy techniques have found that the reaction intermediate of metallo-β-lactamase uses zinc in the resistance pathway.

Another example of the importance of reaction intermediates is seen with AAA-ATPase p97, a protein that used in a variety of cellular metabolic processes. p97 is also linked to degenerative disease and cancer. In a study looking at reaction intermediates of the AAA-ATPase p97 function found an important ADP.P_{i} nucleotide intermediate is important in the p97 molecular operation.

An additional example of biologically relevant reaction intermediates can be found with the RCL enzymes, which catalyzes glycosidic bonds. When studied using methanolysis, it was found that the reaction required the formation of a reaction intermediate.

== See also ==
- Activated complex
- Transition state
