= Venture Meets Mission =

2024 business book

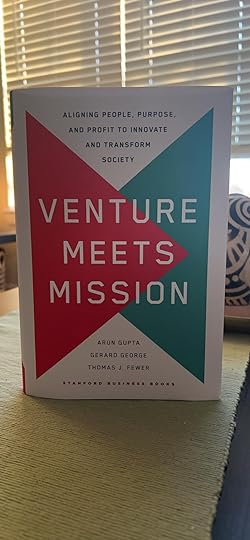
Venture Meets Mission

Venture Meets Mission: Aligning People, Purpose, and Profit to Innovate and Transform Society is a non-fiction book by Arun Gupta, Gerard George, and Thomas J. Fewer. It was published January 9, 2024 with Stanford University Press. The book proposes a new framework for addressing global challenges like climate, cyber, and health, by aligning the innovative power of entrepreneurship with the scale and reach of government.

The book argues that the world is facing a series of unprecedented political, environmental, and technological shifts, demanding solutions beyond the scope of traditional free market or state-controlled innovation. The authors advocate for mission-driven entrepreneurship where ventures pursue both financial success and positive public impact. In this model, the government, academic institutions, capital investors, and industry partners play a key roles in creating a ‘venture meets mission ecosystem'. Together, the authors argue that what is needed to join people, purpose, and profit together for true impact at scale.

== Contents ==
Venture Meets Mission develops concepts through in-depth interviews and deep-dives with key government, industry, and academic leaders. Interviewees associated with the U.S. government include Nate Fick, U.S. Ambassador at Large for Cyberspace and Digital Policy at Department of State; Ann Dunwoody, Four-star General of the U.S. Army (Ret.); Dan Tangherlini, Governor of the United States Postal Service; HR McMaster, U.S. Army General (Ret.); Leslie C. Smith, Former Inspector General of the U.S. Army; and Michael Morrell, Former acting director of the CIA. Interviewees from industry include Thomas Kalil, Chief Innovation Officer at Schmidt Futures; Chris Darby, Former CEO of In-Q-Tel; Jason Matheny, CEO of RAND Corporation; Rahul Singhvi, co-founder and CEO of Resilience; Sree Ramaswamy, Senior policy advisor to the U.S. Secretary of Commerce; and Toni Townes-Whitley, CEO of SAIC. Interviewees from academia include Amy Zegart, Morris Arnold and Nona Jean Cox Senior Fellow at the Hoover Institution; and Francis Fukuyama, Olivier Nomellini Senior Fellow at Stanford University's Freeman Spogli Institute. The authors also present case studies of several organizations, including 1901 Group, Rebellion Defense, In-Q-Tel, Resilience, World Central Kitchen, and EVERFI.

== Reception ==
The book debuted as the 11th top-selling book on USA TODAY's Best-selling Booklist and number 11 on Publishers Weekly Hardcover Nonfiction Bestseller Booklist. The book was reviewed in Investor's Business Daily, Stanford Social Innovation Review, Big Think, and Federal News Network's Federal Drive with Tom Temin.

Midwest Book Review commented that Venture Meets Mission is "a welcome and timely addition to personal, professional, community, corporate, and college/university library Contemporary Business Development & Entrepreneurship collections." IEDP called the book "essentially optimistic" about the role of government and the future of democracy. Library Journal suggested that the book "espouses a libertarian view" of the role of business and innovation in society.

According to an interview with author Thomas Fewer, Venture Meets Mission laid the foundation for NobleReach Foundation, a not-for-profit organization that aims to mobilize and coordinate the United States' tech and talent pipelines. Both Gupta and Fewer helped to found the foundation, with Gupta as CEO and Fewer as vice president.
