= Collision theory =

Chemistry principle

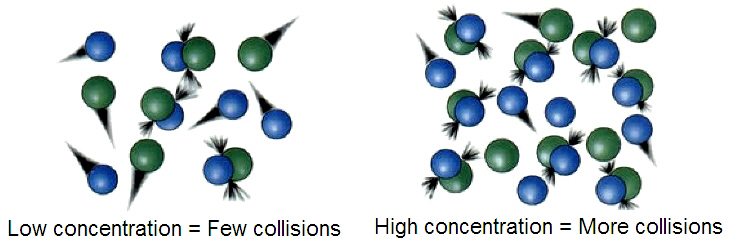
Reaction rate tends to increase with concentration phenomenon explained by collision theory

Collision theory is a principle of chemistry used to predict the rates of chemical reactions. It states that when suitable particles of the reactant hit each other with the correct orientation, only a certain amount of collisions result in a perceptible or notable change; these successful changes are called successful collisions. The successful collisions must have enough energy, also known as activation energy, at the moment of impact to break the pre-existing bonds and form all new bonds. This results in the products of the reaction. The activation energy is often predicted using the transition state theory. Increasing the concentration of the reactant brings about more collisions and hence more successful collisions. Increasing the temperature increases the average kinetic energy of the molecules in a solution, increasing the number of collisions that have enough energy. Collision theory was proposed independently by Max Trautz in 1916 and William Lewis in 1918.

When a catalyst is involved in the collision between the reactant molecules, less energy is required for the chemical change to take place, and hence more collisions have sufficient energy for the reaction to occur. The reaction rate therefore increases.

Collision theory is closely related to chemical kinetics.

Collision theory was initially developed for the gas reaction system with no dilution. But most reactions involve solutions, for example, gas reactions in a carrying inert gas, and almost all reactions in solutions. The collision frequency of the solute molecules in these solutions is now controlled by diffusion or Brownian motion of individual molecules. The flux of the diffusive molecules follows Fick's laws of diffusion. For particles in a solution, an example model to calculate the collision frequency and associated coagulation rate is the Smoluchowski coagulation equation proposed by Marian Smoluchowski in a seminal 1916 publication. In this model, Fick's flux at the infinite time limit is used to mimic the particle speed of the collision theory.

== Rate equations ==
The rate for a bimolecular gas-phase reaction, A + B → product, predicted by collision theory is

$$r(T) = kn_\text{A}n_\text{B}= Z \rho \exp \left( \frac{-E_\text{a}}{RT} \right)$$

where:

- k is the rate constant in units of (number of molecules)^{−1}⋅s^{−1}⋅m^{3}.
- n_{A} is the number density of A in the gas in units of m^{−3}.
- n_{B} is the number density of B in the gas in units of m^{−3}. E.g. for a gas mixture with gas A concentration 0.1 mol⋅L^{−1} and B concentration 0.2 mol⋅L^{−1}, the number of density of A is 0.1×6.02×10^{23}÷10^{−3} = 6.02×10^{25} m^{−3}, the number of density of B is 0.2×6.02×10^{23}÷10^{−3} = 1.2×10^{26} m^{−3}
- Z is the collision frequency in units of m^{−3}⋅s^{−1}.
- $\rho$ is the steric factor.
- E_{a} is the activation energy of the reaction, in units of J⋅mol^{−1}.
- T is the temperature in units of K.
- R is the gas constant in units of J mol^{−1}K^{−1}.

The unit of r(T) can be converted to mol⋅L^{−1}⋅s^{−1}, after divided by (1000×N_{A}), where N_{A} is the Avogadro constant.

For a reaction between A and B, the collision frequency calculated with the hard-sphere model with the unit number of collisions per m^{3} per second is:

$$Z = n_\text{A} n_\text{B} \sigma_\text{AB} \sqrt\frac{8 k_\text{B} T}{\pi \mu_\text{AB}} = 10^6N_A^2\text{[A][B]} \sigma_\text{AB} \sqrt\frac{8 k_\text{B} T}{\pi \mu_\text{AB}}$$

where:

- n_{A} is the number density of A in the gas in units of m^{−3}.
- n_{B} is the number density of B in the gas in units of m^{−3}. E.g. for a gas mixture with gas A concentration 0.1 mol⋅L^{−1} and B concentration 0.2 mol⋅L^{−1}, the number of density of A is 0.1×6.02×10^{23}÷10^{−3} = 6.02×10^{25} m^{−3}, the number of density of B is 0.2×6.02×10^{23}÷10^{−3} = 1.2×10^{26} m^{−3}.
- σ_{AB} is the reaction cross section (unit m^{2}), the area when two molecules collide with each other, simplified to $\sigma_\text{AB} = \pi(r_\text{A}+r_\text{B})^2$, where r_{A} the radius of A and r_{B} the radius of B in unit m.
- k_{B} is the Boltzmann constant unit J⋅K^{−1}.
- T is the absolute temperature (unit K).
- μ_{AB} is the reduced mass of the reactants A and B, $\mu_\text{AB} = \frac{{m_\text{A}}{m_\text{B}}}{{m_\text{A}} + {m_\text{B}}}$ (unit kg).
- N_{A} is the Avogadro constant.
- [A] is molar concentration of A in unit mol⋅L^{−1}.
- [B] is molar concentration of B in unit mol⋅L^{−1}.
- Z can be converted to mole collision per liter per second dividing by 1000N_{A}.

If all the units that are related to dimension are converted to dm, i.e. mol⋅dm^{−3} for [A] and [B], dm^{2} for σ_{AB}, dm^{2}⋅kg⋅s^{−2}⋅K^{−1} for the Boltzmann constant, then

$$Z = N_\text{A}^2 \sigma_\text{AB} \sqrt\frac{8 k_\text{B} T}{\pi \mu_\text{AB}}[\text{A}][\text{B}] = k [A][B]$$

unit mol⋅dm^{−3}⋅s^{−1}.

== Quantitative insights ==
=== Derivation ===
Consider the bimolecular elementary reaction:

A + B → C

In collision theory it is considered that two particles A and B will collide if their nuclei get closer than a certain distance. The area around a molecule A in which it can collide with an approaching B molecule is called the cross section (σ_{AB}) of the reaction and is, in simplified terms, the area corresponding to a circle whose radius ($r_{AB}$) is the sum of the radii of both reacting molecules, which are supposed to be spherical. A moving molecule will therefore sweep a volume $\pi r^{2}_{AB} c_A$ per second as it moves, where $c_A$ is the average velocity of the particle. (This solely represents the classical notion of a collision of solid balls. As molecules are quantum-mechanical many-particle systems of electrons and nuclei based upon the Coulomb and exchange interactions, generally they neither obey rotational symmetry nor do they have a box potential. Therefore, more generally the cross section is defined as the reaction probability of a ray of A particles per areal density of B targets, which makes the definition independent from the nature of the interaction between A and B. Consequently, the radius $r_{AB}$ is related to the length scale of their interaction potential.)

From kinetic theory it is known that a molecule of A has an average velocity (different from root mean square velocity) of $c_A = \sqrt \frac{8 k_\text{B} T}{\pi m_A}$, where $k_\text{B}$ is the Boltzmann constant, and $m_A$ is the mass of the molecule.

The solution of the two-body problem states that two different moving bodies can be treated as one body which has the reduced mass of both and moves with the velocity of the center of mass, so, in this system $\mu_{AB}$ must be used instead of $m_A$. Thus, for a given molecule A, it travels $t=l/c_A=1/(n_B\sigma_{AB}c_A)$ before hitting a molecule B if all B is fixed with no movement, where $l$ is the average traveling distance. Since B also moves, the relative velocity can be calculated using the reduced mass of A and B.

Therefore, the total collision frequency, of all A molecules, with all B molecules, is

$$Z = n_\text{A} n_\text{B} \sigma_{AB} \sqrt\frac{8 k_\text{B} T}{\pi \mu_{AB}} = 10^6N_A^2[A][B] \sigma_{AB} \sqrt\frac{8 k_\text{B} T}{\pi \mu_{AB}} = z[A][B],$$

From Maxwell–Boltzmann distribution it can be deduced that the fraction of collisions with more energy than the activation energy is $e^{\frac{-E_\text{a}}{RT}}$. Therefore, the rate of a bimolecular reaction for ideal gases will be

$r = z \rho [A][B] \exp\left( \frac{-E_\text{a}}{RT} \right),$ in unit number of molecular reactions s^{−1}⋅m^{−3},

where:

- Z is the collision frequency with unit s^{−1}⋅m^{−3}. The z is Z without [A][B].
- $\rho$ is the steric factor, which will be discussed in detail in the next section,
- E_{a} is the activation energy (per mole) of the reaction in unit J/mol,
- T is the absolute temperature in unit K,
- R is the gas constant in unit J/mol/K.
- [A] is molar concentration of A in unit mol/L,
- [B] is molar concentration of B in unit mol/L.

The product zρ is equivalent to the preexponential factor of the Arrhenius equation.

=== Validity of the theory and steric factor ===
Once a theory is formulated, its validity must be tested, that is, compare its predictions with the results of the experiments.

When the expression form of the rate constant is compared with the rate equation for an elementary bimolecular reaction, $r = k(T) [A][B]$, it is noticed that

$$k(T) = N_A \sigma_{AB}\rho \sqrt \frac{8 k_\text{B} T}{\pi \mu_{AB}} \exp \left( \frac{-E_\text{a}}{RT} \right)$$

unit M^{−1}⋅s^{−1} (= dm^{3}⋅mol^{−1}⋅s^{−1}), with all dimension unit dm including k_{B}.

This expression is similar to the Arrhenius equation and gives the first theoretical explanation for the Arrhenius equation on a molecular basis. The weak temperature dependence of the preexponential factor is so small compared to the exponential factor that it cannot be measured experimentally, that is, "it is not feasible to establish, on the basis of temperature studies of the rate constant, whether the predicted T^{1/2} dependence of the preexponential factor is observed experimentally".

==== Steric factor ====
If the values of the predicted rate constants are compared with the values of known rate constants, it is noticed that collision theory fails to estimate the constants correctly, and the more complex the molecules are, the more it fails. The reason for this is that particles have been supposed to be spherical and able to react in all directions, which is not true, as the orientation of the collisions is not always proper for the reaction. For example, in the hydrogenation reaction of ethylene the H_{2} molecule must approach the bonding zone between the atoms, and only a few of all the possible collisions fulfill this requirement.

To alleviate this problem, a new concept must be introduced: the steric factor ρ. It is defined as the ratio between the experimental value and the predicted one (or the ratio between the frequency factor and the collision frequency):

$$\rho = \frac{A_\text{observed}}{Z_\text{calculated}},$$

and it is most often less than unity.

Usually, the more complex the reactant molecules, the lower the steric factor. Nevertheless, some reactions exhibit steric factors greater than unity: the harpoon reactions, which involve atoms that exchange electrons, producing ions. The deviation from unity can have different causes: the molecules are not spherical, so different geometries are possible; not all the kinetic energy is delivered into the right spot; the presence of a solvent (when applied to solutions), etc.

Experimental rate constants compared to the ones predicted by collision theory for gas phase reactions
Reaction	A, s^{−1}M^{−1}	Z, s^{−1}M^{−1}	Steric factor
2ClNO → 2Cl + 2NO	9.4×10^{9}	5.9×10^{10}	0.16
2ClO → Cl_{2} + O_{2}	6.3×10^{7}	2.5×10^{10}	2.3×10^{−3}
H_{2} + C_{2}H_{4} → C_{2}H_{6}	1.24×10^{6}	7.3×10^{11}	1.7×10^{−6}
Br_{2} + K → KBr + Br	1.0×10^{12}	2.1×10^{11}	4.3

Collision theory can be applied to reactions in solution; in that case, the solvent cage has an effect on the reactant molecules, and several collisions can take place in a single encounter, which leads to predicted preexponential factors being too large. ρ values greater than unity can be attributed to favorable entropic contributions.

Experimental rate constants compared to the ones predicted by collision theory for reactions in solution
Reaction	Solvent	A, 10^{11} s^{−1}⋅M^{−1}	Z, 10^{11} s^{−1}⋅M^{−1}	Steric factor
C_{2}H_{5}Br + OH^{−}	ethanol	4.30	3.86	1.11
C_{2}H_{5}O^{−} + CH_{3}I	ethanol	2.42	1.93	1.25
ClCH_{2}CO_{2}^{−} + OH^{−}	water	4.55	2.86	1.59
C_{3}H_{6}Br_{2} + I^{−}	methanol	1.07	1.39	0.77
HOCH_{2}CH_{2}Cl + OH^{−}	water	25.5	2.78	9.17
4-CH_{3}C_{6}H_{4}O^{−} + CH_{3}I	ethanol	8.49	1.99	4.27
CH_{3}(CH_{2})_{2}Cl + I^{−}	acetone	0.085	1.57	0.054
C_{5}H_{5}N + CH_{3}I	C_{2}H_{2}Cl_{4}	—	—	2.0 10×10^{−6}

== Alternative collision models for diluted solutions ==
Collision in diluted gas or liquid solution is regulated by diffusion instead of direct collisions, which can be calculated from Fick's laws of diffusion. Theoretical models to calculate the collision frequency in solutions have been proposed by Marian Smoluchowski in a seminal 1916 publication at the infinite time limit.

For a diluted solution in the gas or the liquid phase, the collision equation developed for neat gas is not suitable when diffusion takes control of the collision frequency, i.e., the direct collision between the two molecules no longer dominates. For any given molecule A, it has to collide with a lot of solvent molecules, let's say molecule C, before finding the B molecule to react with. Thus the probability of collision should be calculated using the Brownian motion model, which can be approximated to a diffusive flux using various boundary conditions that yield different equations in the Smoluchowski.

For the diffusive collision, at the infinite time limit when the molecular flux can be calculated from the Fick's laws of diffusion, in 1916 Smoluchowski derived a collision frequency between molecule A and B in a diluted solution:

$$Z_{AB} = 4 \pi R D_r C_A C_B$$

where:

- $Z_{AB}$ is the collision frequency, unit #collisions/s in 1 m^{3} of solution.
- $R$ is the radius of the collision cross-section, unit m.
- $D_r$ is the relative diffusion constant between A and B, unit m^{2}/s, and $D_r = D_A + D_B$.
- $C_A$ and $C_B$ are the number concentrations of molecules A and B in the solution respectively, unit #molecule/m^{3}.

or

$$Z_{AB} = 1000 N_A * 4 \pi R D_r [A] [B] = k [A] [B]$$

where:

- $Z_{AB}$ is in unit mole collisions/s in 1 L of solution.
- $N_\text{A}$ is the Avogadro constant.
- $R$ is the radius of the collision cross-section, unit m.
- $D_r$ is the relative diffusion constant between A and B, unit m^{2}/s.
- $[A]$ and $[B]$ are the molar concentrations of A and B respectively, unit mol/L.
- $k$ is the diffusive collision rate constant, unit L mol^{−1} s^{−1}.

== See also ==
- Two-dimensional gas
- Rate equation
