= Q10 (temperature coefficient) =

Measure of temperature sensitivity in muscles

A plot illustrating the dependence on temperature of the rates of chemical reactions and various biological processes, for several different Q_{10} temperature coefficients. The rate ratio at a temperature increase of 10 degrees (marked by points) is equal to the Q_{10} coefficient.

The Q_{10} temperature coefficient is a mathematical parameter that is thought to come from the late 19th century, in the work of van ’t Hoff. Q_{10} is a measure of temperature sensitivity based on chemical reaction rates, and it applies to most physiological processes (e.g., respiration, digestion, photosynthesis).

The Q_{10} is calculated as:

$$Q_{10}=\left( \frac{R_2}{R_1} \right )^{10 \,^\circ \mathrm{C}/(T_2-T_1) }$$

where;

R is the rate with a context-dependent unit.
T is the temperature in degrees Celsius or kelvin.

Rewriting this equation, the assumption behind Q_{10} is that the reaction rate R depends exponentially on temperature:

$$R_2 = R_1 ~Q_{10}^{(T_2-T_1)/10 \,^{\circ} \mathrm{C}}$$

Q_{10} is a unitless quantity, as it is the factor by which a rate changes. In this equation, R_{1} represents the rate at the reference temperature T_{1}. In environmental sciences, the reference temperature for calculating Q_{10} is often chosen to be 0 °C or 10°C. If the reference temperature is 10 °C, Q_{10} represents the factor by which the rate is multiplied for each 10°C increase in temperature. For most biological systems, the Q_{10} value is ~ 2 to 3 (the rate doubles or triples for every 10 °C increase in temperature).

== In muscle performance ==
The effects of temperature on enzyme activity. Top - increasing temperature increases the rate of reaction (Q_{10} coefficient). Middle - the fraction of folded and functional enzyme decreases above its denaturation temperature. Bottom - consequently, an enzyme's optimal rate of reaction is at an intermediate temperature.

The temperature of a muscle has a significant effect on the velocity and power of the muscle contraction, with performance generally declining with decreasing temperatures and increasing with rising temperatures. The Q_{10} coefficient represents the degree of temperature dependence a muscle exhibits as measured by contraction rates. A Q_{10} of 1.0 indicates thermal independence of a muscle whereas an increasing Q_{10} value indicates increasing thermal dependence. Values less than 1.0 indicate a negative or inverse thermal dependence, i.e., a decrease in muscle performance as temperature increases.

Q_{10} values for biological processes vary with temperature. Decreasing muscle temperature results in a substantial decline of muscle performance such that a 10 degree Celsius temperature decrease results in at least a 50% decline in muscle performance. Persons who have fallen into icy water may gradually lose the ability to swim or grasp safety lines due to this effect, although other effects such as atrial fibrillation are a more immediate cause of drowning deaths. At some minimum temperature biological systems do not function at all, but performance increases with rising temperature (Q_{10} of 2-4) to a maximum performance level and thermal independence (Q_{10} of 1.0-1.5). With continued increase in temperature, performance decreases rapidly (Q_{10} of 0.2-0.8) up to a maximum temperature at which all biological function again ceases.

Within vertebrates, different skeletal muscle activity has correspondingly different thermal dependencies. The rate of muscle twitch contractions and relaxations are thermally dependent (Q_{10} of 2.0-2.5), whereas maximum contraction, e.g., tetanic contraction, is thermally independent.

Muscles of some ectothermic species. e.g., sharks, show less thermal dependence at lower temperatures than endothermic species

== See also ==
- Arrhenius equation
- Arrhenius plot
- Isotonic (exercise physiology)
- Isometric exercise
- Skeletal striated muscle
- Tetanic contraction
