= Absorptive capacity =

Firm's ability to exploit new information

In business administration, absorptive capacity is defined as a firm's ability to recognize the value of new information, assimilate it, and apply it to commercial ends. It is studied on individual, group, firm, and national levels. Antecedents are prior-based knowledge (knowledge stocks and knowledge flows) and communication. Studies involve a firm's innovation performance, aspiration level, and organizational learning. It has been said that in order to be innovative an organization should develop its absorptive capacity.

== Cohen and Levinthal's model ==
The concept of absorptive capacity was first defined as a firm's "ability to recognize the value of new information, assimilate it, and apply it to commercial ends" by Cohen and Levinthal. For them, absorptive capacity depends greatly on prior related knowledge and diversity of background. The investments a firm makes into its research and development (R&D) efforts are therefore central to their model of development of absorptive capacity. The absorptive capacity is seen as cumulative, meaning that it is easier for a firm to invest on a constant basis in its absorptive capacity than investing punctually. Efforts put to develop absorptive capacity in one period will make it easier to accumulate it in the next one.

The cumulativeness of absorptive capacity and its effect on expectation formation suggest an extreme case of path dependence in which once a firm ceases investing in its absorptive capacity in a quickly moving field, it may never assimilate and exploit new information in that field, regardless of the value of that information.

Absorptive capacity is also said to be a reason for companies to invest in R&D instead of simply purchasing the results post factum (e.g. patents). Internal R&D teams increase the absorptive capacity of a company. A firm's investment in R&D then impacts directly its absorptive capacity. The more a firm invests in research and development activities, the more it will be able to fully appreciate the value of new external information.

Cohen and Levinthal also stressed that diversity allows an individual to make "novel associations and linkages". They therefore encourage the hiring of diverse teams in order to have a variety of individuals working together and exposing themselves to different ways of looking at things.

== Zahra and George's model ==
Cohen and Levinthal have focused primarily on investments in R&D to develop one's absorptive capacity, but many other researchers showed later on that several other areas could be explored to develop an organization's absorptive capacity. This led to a review of the concept by Shaker Zahra and Gerry George and a reformulation of the definition that expanded greatly the concept and further defined it as being made of two different absorptive capacities: potential absorptive capacity and realized absorptive capacity. Their new definition of absorptive capacity is "a set of organizational routines and processes by which firms acquire, assimilate, transform and exploit knowledge to produce a dynamic organizational capability".

=== Potential absorptive capacity ===
Zahra and George presented the potential absorptive capacity is made of two elements. First there is knowledge acquisition which "refers to a firm's capability to identify and acquire externally generated knowledge that is critical to its operations". Second, there is assimilation capability which "refers to the firm's routines and processes that allow it to analyze, process, interpret and understand the information obtained from external sources". "Potential absorptive capacity makes the firm receptive to acquiring and assimilating external knowledge."

=== Realized absorptive capacity ===
Realized absorptive capacity is made up of transformation capability on one hand that can be defined as "a firm's capability to develop and refine the routines that facilitate combining existing knowledge and the newly acquired and assimilated knowledge". On the other hand, realized absorptive capacity is also made of the exploitation capability of a firm which is basically the capacity of a firm to apply the newly acquired knowledge in product or services that it can get financial benefit from. "Realized absorptive capacity is a function of the transformation and exploitation capabilities."

Zahra and George go on to suggest a series of indicators that can be used to evaluate each element of absorptive capacity.

- Knowledge acquisition capability (the number of years of experience of the R&D department, the amount of R&D investment)
- Assimilation capability (the number of cross-firm patent citations, the number of citations made in a firm's publications to research developed in other firms)
- Transformation capability (the number of new product ideas, the number of new research projects initiated)
- Exploitation capability (the number of patent, the number of new product announcements, the length of product development cycle)

George and his colleagues (Zou, Ertug, George, 2018) conduct a meta-analysis of absorptive capacity and they find that: (1) Absorptive capacity is a strong predictor of innovation and knowledge transfer, and its effects on financial performance are fully mediated by innovation and knowledge transfer; (2) The firm size-absorptive capacity relationship is positive for small firms but negative for larger firms. The firm age-absorptive capacity relationship is negative for mature firms and not significant for young firms; (3) Social integration mechanisms, knowledge infrastructure, management support, and relational capability all have a positive and significant impact on the absorptive capacity-innovation relationship (whereas they do not find the breadth of external search or competitive intensity to impact that relationship). Environmental dynamism has a marginally significant negative impact on the absorptive capacity-innovation relationship; and (4) They also find that the absorptive capacity-innovation relationship is stronger when absorptive capacity is measured by surveys rather than when absorptive capacity is measured by archival proxies.

=== A refined model of absorptive capacity ===
A 2007 article proposed to (a) reintroduce the original first component in Cohen and Levinthal's model. The contribution noted (b) that transformation is not a step after assimilation, but represents an alternative process. Consequently, it suggested that (c) the neat distinction between potential absorptive capacity and realized absorptive capacity does not hold any more.

ad (a): Firms often fail to identify and absorb new external knowledge; recognizing the value of new external knowledge is often biased and needs to be fostered; it is not automatic. Managers have often problems in assessing the value of new external knowledge when it is not relevant for the current demands of key customers.

ad (b): Both assimilation and transformation involve some degree of change of the new knowledge and its combination with the existing knowledge. When the new knowledge fits existing cognitive schemas well, it is assimilated. When the new knowledge cannot be assimilated, the cognitive structures must be transformed. Firms transform their knowledge structures when knowledge cannot be assimilated. Transformation does not follow assimilation, it is an alternative to it.

ad (c): As transformation is an alternative to assimilation and not sequential to assimilation, it becomes part of potential absorptive capacity in Zahra and George's model; consequently, realized absorptive capacity simply relabels the component of exploitation. Further, without the effect of realized capacity, potential capacity cannot have any effect on a firm's competitive advantage; potential absorptive capacity cannot be meaningful separated from realized absorptive capacity in empirical studies on value creation.

Accordingly, firms with high levels of absorptive capacity (1) recognize the value of new external knowledge, (2) acquire, (3) assimilate or transform, and (4) exploit new external knowledge.

However, Zahra and George argue that the concept has a too broad definition as well as no clear dimensions or scales, evidenced by the variations among different studies that have used the absorptive capacity theory. Bosch et al. contend that absorptive capacity should not be based only on prior related knowledge, as Cohen and Levinthal originally proposed, but rather, organizational culture and combinative capabilities should be considered as antecedents to a firm's absorptive capacity. For example, a business culture that appreciates and supports continued learning has a higher absorptive capacity than other business cultures that do not support individual learning and development. To further clarify concepts related to the absorptive capacity theory, Wheeler introduced an application derived from the dynamic capability and absorptive capacity theories for business innovations. Wheeler's Net-Enabled Business Innovation Cycle facilitates understanding and predicting how firms transform its prior orientation and internal resources associated with net-enablement into business innovation and economical growth.

== Other research on the subject ==
Researches on subjects related to the development of absorptive capacity have included studies focusing on research and development, knowledge management, organizational structures, human resources, external interactions, internal interactions, open innovation, social capital, supplier integration, client integration and inter-organizational fit. All those researches provide a better picture of absorptive capacity that makes it possible for any firm to develop its absorptive capacity improving different areas of their organization.

Today the theory involves organizational learning, industrial economics, the resource-based view of the firm and dynamic capabilities. This theory has undergone major refinement, and today a firm's absorptive capacity is mostly conceptualized as a dynamic capability. As a complement to absorptive capacity in outward knowledge transfer, the notion of desorptive capacity was developed. Desorptive capacity may play a key role for managing innovation in networks. It is particularly important for networks and collaborations with mutual, bidirectional knowledge transfer.

Other concepts related to absorptive capacity are:

- Desorptive capacity: This is a complementary concept to absorptive capacity in outward knowledge transfer, following the logic of the chemical process of desorption. Desorptive capacity is defined "as an organization's ability to identify technology transfer opportunities based on a firm's outward technology transfer strategy and to facilitate the technology's application at the recipient". Thus, it influences the volume of knowledge transfer and comprises two process steps - identification and transfer.
- Receptivity: The firm's overall ability to be aware of, identify and take effective advantage of technology.
- Innovative routines: Practiced routines that define a set of competencies the firm is capable of doing confidently and the focus of the firm's innovation efforts.

In regions in the Global South, regional innovation agencies can work as knowledge gatekeepers to stimulate new technological trajectories by facilitating the acquisition, diffusion and engaging in the 'tropicalization' of extra-regional knowledge to facilitate its absorption within the regional innovation system.

== See also ==
- Adaptive capacity
- Change management
- Desorptive capacity
- Double-loop learning
- Innovation
- Knowledge management
