= Steric factor =

Quantity used in collision theory

The steric factor, usually denoted ρ, is a quantity used in collision theory.

Also called the probability factor, the steric factor is defined as the ratio between the experimental value of the rate constant and the one predicted by collision theory. It can also be defined as the ratio between the pre-exponential factor and the collision frequency, and it is most often less than unity. Physically, the steric factor can be interpreted as the ratio of the cross section for reactive collisions to the total collision cross section.

Usually, the more complex the reactant molecules, the lower the steric factors. Nevertheless, some reactions exhibit steric factors greater than unity: the harpoon reactions, which involve atoms that exchange electrons, producing ions. The deviation from unity can have different causes: the molecules are not spherical, so different geometries are possible; not all the kinetic energy is delivered into the right spot; the presence of a solvent (when applied to solutions); and so on.

When collision theory is applied to reactions in solution, the solvent cage has an effect on the reactant molecules, as several collisions can take place in a single encounter, which leads to predicted preexponential factors being too large. ρ values greater than unity can be attributed to favorable entropic contributions.

Usually there is no simple way to accurately estimate steric factors without performing trajectory or scattering calculations. It is also more commonly known as the frequency factor.
