= Desorption =

Release of an atoms or molecules from a surface

Desorption is the physical process where adsorbed atoms or molecules are released from a surface into the surrounding vacuum or fluid. This occurs when a molecule gains enough energy to overcome the activation barrier and the binding energy that keep it attached to the surface.

Desorption is the reverse of the process of adsorption, which differs from absorption in that adsorption refers to substances bound to the surface, rather than being absorbed into the bulk.

Desorption can occur from any of several processes, or a combination of them: it may result from heat (thermal energy); incident light such as infrared, visible, or ultraviolet photons; or an incident beam of energetic particles such as electrons. It may also occur following chemical reactions such as oxidation or reduction in an electrochemical cell or after a chemical reaction of adsorbed compounds in which the surface may act as a catalyst.

== Mechanisms ==
Depending on the nature of the adsorbent-to-surface bond, there are a multitude of mechanisms for desorption. The surface bond of a sorbent can be cleaved thermally, through chemical reactions or by radiation, all which may result in desorption of the species.

=== Thermal desorption ===
Thermal desorption is the process by which an adsorbate is heated and this induces desorption of atoms or molecules from the surface. The first use of thermal desorption was by LeRoy Apker in 1948. It is one of the most frequently used modes of desorption, and can be used to determine surface coverages of adsorbates and to evaluate the activation energy of desorption.

Thermal desorption is typically described by the Polanyi-Wigner equation:

$$r(\theta) = - \frac{\text{d}\theta}{\text{d}t} = \upsilon(\theta) \theta^n \exp\left(\frac{-E(\theta)}{RT}\right)$$

where r is the rate of desorption, $\theta$ is the adsorbate coverage, t the time, n is the order of desorption, $\upsilon$ the pre-exponential factor, E is the activation energy, R is the gas constant and T is the absolute temperature. The adsorbate coverage is defined as the ratio between occupied and available adsorption sites.

The order of desorption, also known as the kinetic order, describes the relationship between the adsorbate coverage and the rate of desorption. In first order desorption, n = 1, the rate of the particles is directly proportional to adsorbate coverage. Atomic or simple molecular desorption tend to be of the first order and in this case the temperature at which maximum desorption occurs is independent of initial adsorbate coverage. Whereas, in second order desorption the temperature of maximum rate of desorption decreases with increased initial adsorbate coverage. This is because second order is re-combinative desorption and with a larger initial coverage there is a higher probability the two particles will find each other and recombine into the desorption product. An example of second order desorption, n = 2, is when two hydrogen atoms on the surface desorb and form a gaseous H_{2} molecule. There is also zeroth order desorption which commonly occurs on thick molecular layers, in this case the desorption rate does not depend on the particle concentration. In the case of zeroth order, n = 0, the desorption will continue to increase with temperature until a sudden drop once all the molecules have been desorbed.

In a typical thermal desorption experiment, one would often assume a constant heating of the sample, and so temperature will increase linearly with time. The rate of heating can be represented by

$$\beta = \frac{\mathrm{d}T}{\mathrm{d}t}$$

Therefore, the temperature can be represented by:

$$T(t) = \beta(t - t_0) + T_0$$

where $t_0$ is the starting time and $T_0$ is the initial temperature. At the "desorption temperature", there is sufficient thermal energy for the molecules to escape the surface. One can use the thermal desorption as a technique to investigate the binding energy of a metal.

There are several different procedures for performing analysis of thermal desorption. For example, Redhead's peak maximum method is one of the ways to determine the activation energy in desorption experiments. For first order desorption, the activation energy is estimated from the temperature (T_{p}) at which the desorption rate is a maximum. Using the equation for rate of desorption (Polyani Winer equation), one can find T_{p}, and Redhead shows that the relationship between T_{p} and E can be approximated to be linear, given that the ratio of the rate constant to the heating rate is within the range 10^{8} – 10^{13}. By varying the heating rate, and then plotting a graph of $\log(\beta)$ against $\log(T_p)$, one can find the activation energy using the following equation:

$\frac{\mathrm{d}\log(\beta)}{\mathrm{d}\log(T_p)} = \frac{E}{RT_p} + 2$

This method is straightforward, routinely applied and can give a value for activation energy within an error of 30%. However a drawback of this method, is that the rate constant in the Polanyi-Wigner equation and the activation energy are assumed to be independent of the surface coverage.

Due to improvement in computational power, there are now several ways to perform thermal desorption analysis without assuming independence of the rate constant and activation energy. For example, the "complete analysis" method uses a family of desorption curves for several different surface coverages and integrates to obtain coverage as a function of temperature. Next, the desorption rate for a particular coverage is determined from each curve and an Arrhenius plot of the logarithm of the rate of desorption against 1/T is made. An example of an Arrhenius plot can be seen in the figure on the right. The activation energy can be found from the gradient of this Arrhenius plot.

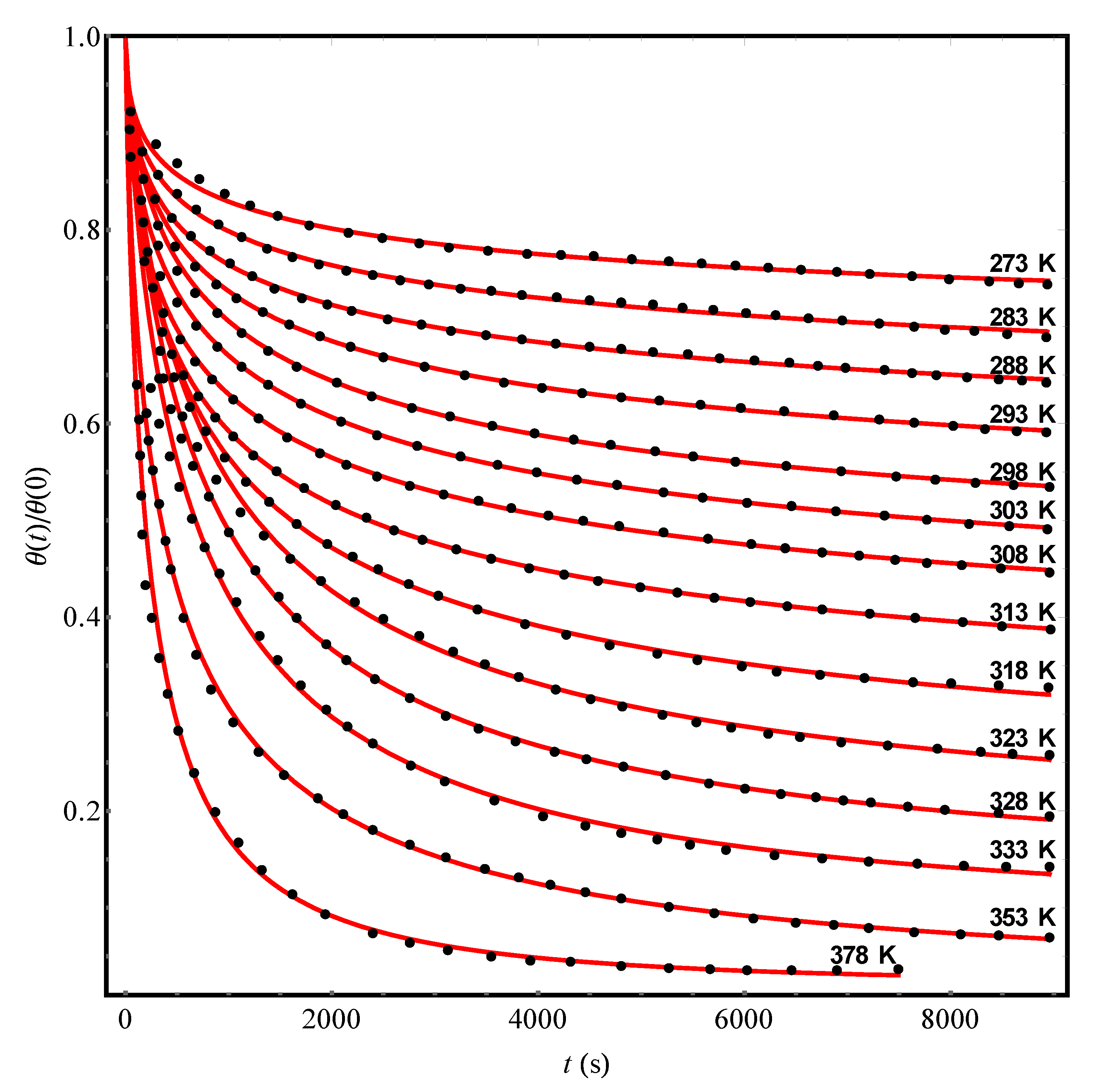
Theoretical processing of the experimental data on n-pentane desorption from pellets of NaX zeolite

It also became possible to account for an effect of the disorder on the value of activation energy E, that leads to a non-Debye desorption kinetics at large times and allows to explain both desorption from close-to-perfect silicon surfaces and desorption from microporous adsorbents like NaX zeolites.

An example of an Arrhenius plot, with the natural logarithm of the rate of reaction (k) plotted against one over the temperature.

Another analysis technique involves simulating thermal desorption spectra and comparing to experimental data. This technique relies on kinetic Monte Carlo simulations and requires an understanding of the lattice interactions of the adsorbed atoms. These interactions are described from first principles by the Lattice Gas Hamiltonian, which varies depending on the arrangement of the atoms. An example of this method used to investigate the desorption of oxygen from rhodium can be found in the following paper: "Kinetic Monte Carlo simulations of temperature programed desorption of O/Rh(111)".

=== Reductive or oxidative desorption ===
In some cases, the adsorbed molecule is chemically bonded to the surface/material, providing a strong adhesion and limiting desorption. If this is the case, desorption requires a chemical reaction which cleaves the chemical bonds. One way to accomplish this is to apply a voltage to the surface, resulting in either reduction or oxidation of the adsorbed molecule (depending on the bias and the adsorbed molecules).

In a typical example of reductive desorption, a self-assembled monolayer of alkyl thiols on a gold surface can be removed by applying a negative bias to the surface resulting in reduction of the sulfur head-group. The chemical reaction for this process would be:

$$R - S - Au + e^- \longrightarrow R - S^- + Au$$

where R is an alkyl chain (e.g. CH_{3}), S is the sulfur atom of the thiol group, Au is a gold surface atom and e^{−} is an electron supplied by an external voltage source.

Another application for reductive/oxidative desorption is to clean active carbon material through electrochemical regeneration.

=== Electron-stimulated desorption ===
shows the effects of an incident electron beam on adsorbed molecules

Electron-stimulated desorption occurs as a result of an electron beam incident upon a surface in vacuum, as is common in particle physics and industrial processes such as scanning electron microscopy (SEM). At atmospheric pressure, molecules may weakly bond to surfaces in what is known as adsorption. These molecules may form monolayers at a density of 10^{15} atoms/cm^{2} for a perfectly smooth surface. One monolayer or several may form, depending on the bonding capabilities of the molecules. If an electron beam is incident upon the surface, it provides energy to break the bonds of the surface with molecules in the adsorbed monolayer(s), causing pressure to increase in the system. Once a molecule is desorbed into the vacuum volume, it is removed via the vacuum's pumping mechanism (re-adsorption is negligible). Hence, fewer molecules are available for desorption, and an increasing number of electrons are required to maintain constant desorption.

One of the leading models on electron stimulated desorption is described by Peter Antoniewicz In short, his theory is that the adsorbate becomes ionized by the incident electrons and then the ion experiences an image charge potential which attracts it towards the surface. As the ion moves closer to the surface, the possibility of electron tunnelling from the substrate increases and through this process ion neutralisation can occur. The neutralised ion still has kinetic energy from before, and if this energy plus the gained potential energy is greater than the binding energy then the ion can desorb from the surface. As ionisation is required for this process, this suggests the atom cannot desorb at low excitation energies, which agrees with experimental data on electron simulated desorption. Understanding electron stimulated desorption is crucial for accelerators such as the Large Hadron Collider, where surfaces are subjected to an intense bombardment of energetic electrons. In particular, in the beam vacuum systems the desorption of gases can strongly impact the accelerators performance by modifying the secondary electron yield of the surfaces.

=== IR photodesorption ===
IR photodesorption is a type of desorption that occurs when an infrared light hits a surface and activates processes involving the excitation of an internal vibrational mode of the previously absorbed molecules followed by the desorption of the species into the gas phase. One can selectively excite electrons or vibrations of the adsorbate or of the adsorbate-substrate coupled system. This relaxation of the bonds together with a sufficient energy exchange from the incident light to the system will eventually lead to desorption.

Generally, the phenomenon is more effective for weaker-bound physisorbed species, which have a smaller adsorption potential depth compared to that of the chemisorbed ones. In fact, a shallower potential requires lower laser intensities to set a molecule free from the surface and make IR-photodesorption experiments feasible, because the measured desorption times are usually longer than the inverse of the other relaxation rates in the problem.

=== Phonon activated desorption ===
In 2005, a mode of desorption was discovered by John Weaver et al. that has elements of both thermal and electron stimulated desorption. This mode is of particular interest as desorption can occur in a closed system without external stimulus. The mode was discovered whilst investigating bromine absorbed on silicone using scanning tunnelling microscopy. In the experiment, the Si-Br wafers were heated to temperatures ranging from 620 to 775 K. However, it was not simple thermal desorption bond breaking that was observed as the activation energies calculated from Arrhenius plots were found to be lower than the Si-Br bond strength. Instead, the optical phonons of the Silicon weaken the surface bond through vibrations and also provide the energy for electron to excite to the antibonding state.

== Application ==
Desorption is a physical process that can be very useful for several applications. In this section two applications of thermal desorption are explained. One of them is actually a technique of thermal desorption, temperature programmed desorption, rather than an application itself, but it has plenty of very important applications. The other one is the application of thermal desorption with the aim of reducing pollution.

=== Temperature programmed desorption (TPD) ===
Temperature programmed desorption (TPD) is one of the most widely used surface analysis techniques available for materials research science. It has several applications such as knowing the desorption rates and binding energies of chemical compounds and elements, evaluation of active sites on catalyst surfaces and the understanding of the mechanisms of catalytic reactions including adsorption, surface reaction and desorption, analysing material compositions, surface interactions and surface contaminates. Therefore, TPD is increasingly important in many industries including, but not limited to, quality control and industrial research on products such as polymers, pharmaceuticals, clays and minerals, food packaging, and metals and alloys.

When TPD is used with the aim of knowing desorption rates of products that were previously adsorbed on a surface, it consists of heating a cold crystal surface that adsorbed a gas or a mixture of gases at a controlled rate. Then, the adsorbates will react as they are heated and then they will desorb from the surface. The results of applying TPD are the desorption rates of each of the product species that have been desorbed as a function of the temperature of the surface, this is called the TPD spectrum of the product. Also, as the temperature at which each of the surface compounds has been desorbed is known, it is possible to compute the energy that bounded the desorbed compound to the surface, the activation energy.

=== Thermal desorption for removal of pollution ===
Desorption, specifically thermal desorption, can be applied as an environmental remediation technique. This physical process is designed to remove contaminants at relatively low temperatures, ranging from 90 to 560 °C, from the solid matrix. The contaminated media is heated to make the water and organic contaminants volatile, followed by treatment in a gas treatment system in which after removal, the contaminants are collected or thermally destroyed. They are transported using a carrier gas or vacuum to a vapor treatment system for removal/transformation into less toxic compounds.

Thermal desorption systems operate at a lower design temperature, which is sufficiently high to achieve adequate volatilization of organic contaminants. Temperatures and residence times are designed to make selected contaminants volatile, but typically will not oxidize them. It is applicable at sites where high direct waste burial is present, and a short timeframe is necessary to allow for continued use or redevelopment of the site.

== See also ==
- Adsorption
- Chemisorption
- Desorptive capacity
- Gibbs isotherm
- Langmuir equation
- Moisture sorption isotherm
- Sorption isotherm
