= James McCall =

James McCall may refer to:

- James McCall (politician) (1774–1856), American merchant and politician from New York
- James McCall (veterinary surgeon) (1834–1915), founder and the first principal of Glasgow Veterinary College
- James McCall (footballer) (1865–1925), Scottish footballer
- James F. McCall, United States Army general
- Nocando (James McCall, born 1983), American rapper
- James McCall, rapper with hip-hop duo Zay Hilfigerrr & Zayion McCall
- James McCall, founder of the magazine McCall's
