= Eleanor Hadley =

American economist (1916–2007)

Eleanor Hadley Order of the Sacred Treasure
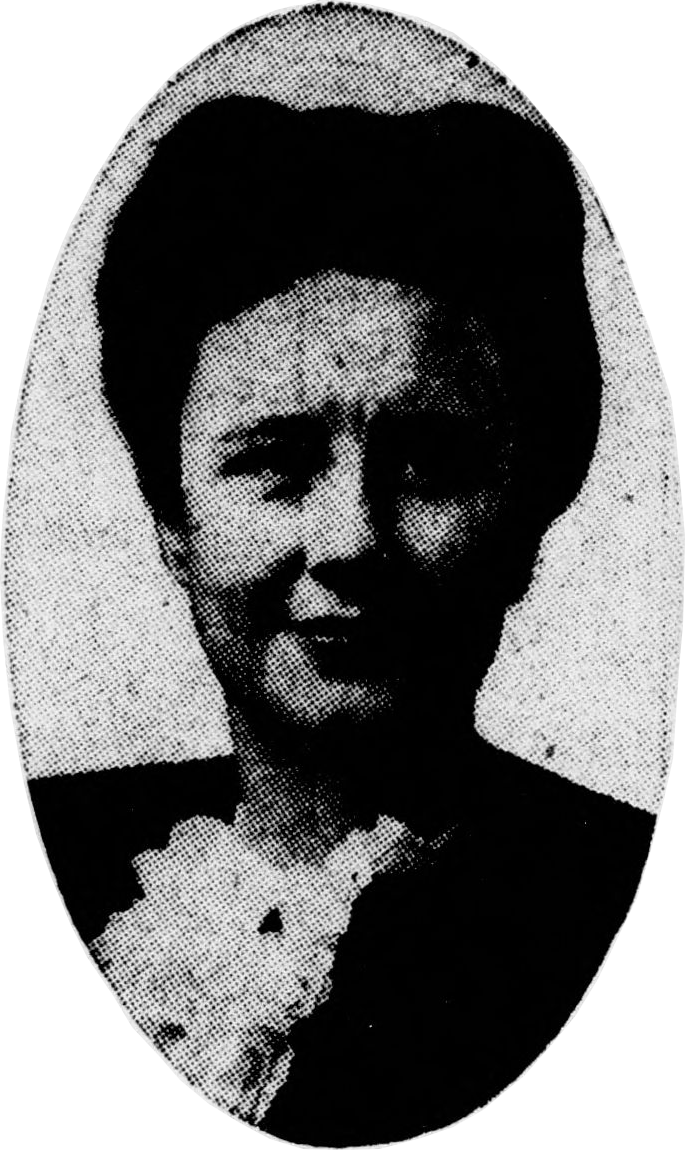
- Born: July 17, 1916; Seattle, Washington, U.S.
- Died: June 1, 2007 (aged 90); Seattle, Washington, U.S.
- Occupations: Economist; policymaker; professor; research analyst

Academic background
- Education: Mills College; Tokyo Imperial University; Radcliffe College
- Thesis: Concentrated Business Power in Japan (1949)

Academic work
- Discipline: Economics
- Sub-discipline: Japan studies; modern Japanese economy
- Institutions: Smith College; George Washington University; U. S. Tariff Commission; General Accounting Office
- Notable works: Antitrust in Japan (1970)

Eleanor Martha Hadley (July 17, 1916 – June 1, 2007) was an American economist and policymaker. Because of her relatively rare research specialization in Japanese economics, during World War II Hadley was recruited first into OSS and then the State Department to support the United States' war effort while she was a doctoral candidate in economics at Radcliffe College. Hadley helped draft the United States' plans for dissolving zaibatsu business conglomerates as part of a planned effort to democratize Japan after the war, and she participated in implementing this economic deconcentration program when the postwar occupation brought her to Japan to work for SCAP as an economist.

After ending her time with SCAP in the occupation of Japan, Hadley completed her dissertation, earning her doctorate at Radcliffe College. Although interested in continuing a career in working for the United States, she discovered that she could not obtain meaningful work in government because Charles A. Willoughby, an ultraconservative military officer in the occupation, had blacklisted her, resulting in the denial of necessary security clearance. Hadley turned to academia, and she taught at Smith College and George Washington University. After Hadley finally cleared her name and achieved clearance, she worked in government for the U. S. Tariff Commission and General Accounting Office from 1967 to 1981.

In 1970, Princeton University Press published Hadley's monograph Antitrust in Japan. Economist George Cyril Allen called Antitrust "undoubtedly the most comprehensive and authoritative" study on zaibatsu and their dissolution available in the Western world. Hadley received the Order of the Sacred Treasure, third degree, from the Japanese government in 1986, and in 1997 she received the Association for Asian Studies' Award for Distinguished Contributions.

== Early education ==
Eleanor Martha Hadley was born July 17, 1916, in Seattle, Washington to parents Homer and Margaret Hadley. Homer Hadley was a locally famous civil engineer and later the namesake of the Homer M. Hadley Memorial Bridge spanning part of Lake Washington. Margaret Hadley was a teacher who specialized in preschool education and the education of children with disabilities. Growing up, Hadley's family was relatively well off.

After graduating from Seattle's Franklin High School in 1934, Hadley enrolled at Mills College in Oakland, California. While a student at Mills, she participated in the nascent Japan–America Student Conferences, attending the program's 1935 conference in Portland, Oregon and its 1936 conference in Japan, the latter as the Mills College delegate. Hadley's interest in international affairs continued, and she attended a conference of the International Relations Club at Mills College in 1937. Hadley graduated from Mills in 1938 with a degree in politics, economics, and philosophy.

Hadley received a fellowship from Tokyo Imperial University which financed a stay in Tokyo from 1938 to 1940, during which time she also traveled extensively in Japan and China. In addition to being one of the few Americans to have studied in Japan before the outbreak of war between the United States and Japan, Hadley was also among the earliest Westerners to go to Nanjing after the Nanjing Massacre three years earlier. After returning to the United States, Hadley continued her education at Radcliffe College (at the time a coordinate institution through which women could attend classes at Harvard University, which only admitted male students), enrolling there in 1941 to seek a doctorate in economics.

== State Department career ==
After the Empire of Japan's December 7, 1941 attack on Pearl Harbor, the United States formally entered World War II. After completing her comprehensive examinations but not her dissertation, Hadley was recruited by Charles Burton Fahs—chief of the Research and Analysis Division (Far East) at the State Department—to work as a research analyst for the Office of Strategic Services (OSS) starting in 1943. There, Hadley completed a project about Japan's wooden-shipbuilding industry, and she proposed that OSS next study industrial organization. Fortuitously for Hadley, the economic section of the State, War, Navy Coordinating Council (SWNCC)'s economic section needed to draft a paper on the zaibatsu business combines of Japan's modern economy, related to industrial organization.

Hadley was transferred to the State Department in late 1944, called upon for what the Association for Asian Studies later described as her "rare expertise on the Japanese economy," and she "helped plan the Japanese deconcentration program". Hadley went to work studying zaibatsu in the Business Practice Branch of the International Area Committee for the Far East's Commodities Division, and she concluded that zaibatsu were "one of the architects of Japan's irresponsible government" in the years of its military aggression. When SWNCC drafted the Basic Directive—policy directions to guide Douglas MacArthur during the anticipated occupation of Japan—Hadley drafted the research policy paper undergirding the portion of the Directive which recommended dissolving the zaibatsu in order to democratize the Japanese economy.

== Occupation of Japan ==
Japan publicly announced its surrender on August 15, 1945, and formally surrendered to the United States on September 2, 1945. The Allied Powers, with the United States leading, began a military occupation of Japan with Douglas MacArthur as Supreme Commander for the Allied Powers (SCAP). Early in the occupation, the Yasuda zaibatsu submitted an economic plan to SCAP which called for dissolving the zaibatsu holding companies but not the business combines themselves. When MacArthur approved this plan, the American press criticized the decision as too lenient, and United States president Harry S. Truman sent a team of economists led by Corwin Edwards to address these concerns in January 1946. Hadley was interested in immediate assignment to work for SCAP as part of the Edwards mission, but she was kept off the all-male team, despite having written the zaibatsu policy paper, because she was a woman. Hadley, still a doctoral candidate with an in-progress dissertation, finally joined the occupation in April 1946 when SCAP's Government Section issued a request for staff familiar with Japan. Hadley worked directly for the Government Section, but she also assisted the Economic and Scientific Section's Anti-Trust and Cartels Division.

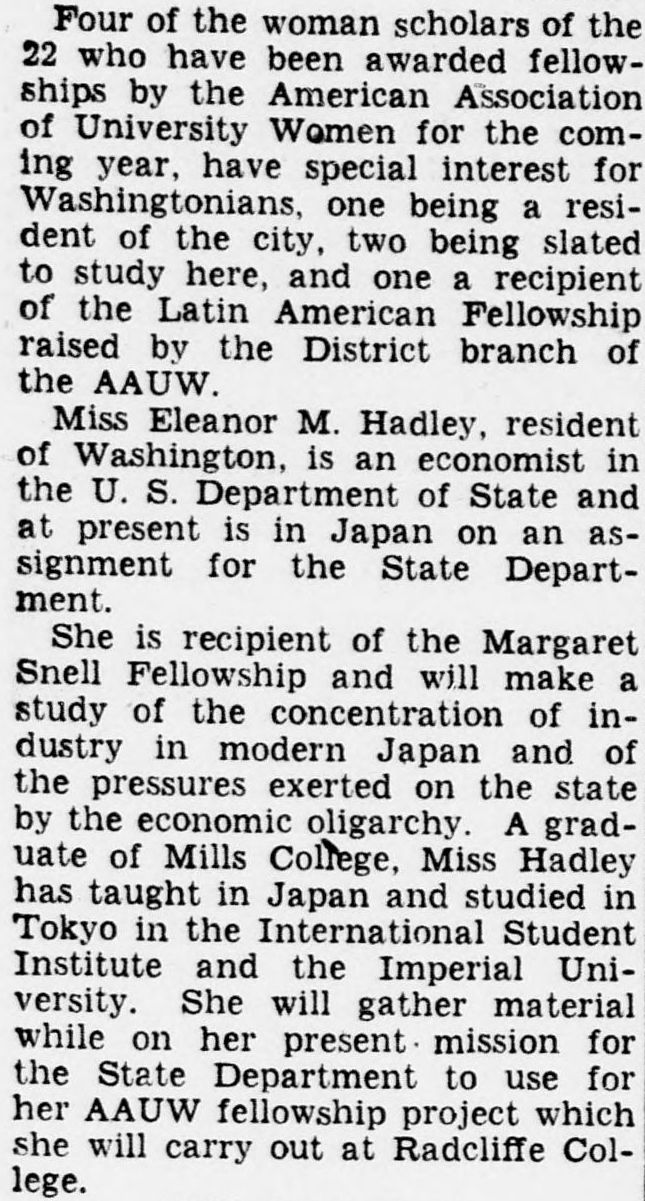
The D. C. Evening Star reporting on Hadley's AAUW fellowship.

Upon arrival, in addition to being one of the first women professionals to work at SCAP, Hadley soon played what economists Patricia Hagan Kuwayama and Hugh T. Patrick call a "key role" in the occupation because for several months she was "the only member of the Occupation staff with a knowledge of and commitment to the economic deconcentration program" outlined in the Basic Directive she had helped write. Breaking up the zaibatsu was Hadley's role in the occupation.

Hadley's first memorandum, written to Major General Courtney Whitney in June 1946, pointed out the Yasuda plan's deviation from the Basic Direction, which called for dissolving business combines as well as holding companies. Hadley's memo eventually influenced MacArthur to pursue more vigorous deconcentration policy, including purging more than 1,500 corporate officers as part of dissolving the zaibatsu, and Hadley was assigned to help implement this. Hadley was also involved in establishing the Japan Fair Trade Commission and creating antitrust competition laws. Ultimately, deconcentration laid the groundwork for modern Japan becoming a "more open and democratic society as well as a more competitive and stronger economy," Kuwayama and Patrick explain.

When Hadley first arrived at SCAP, her rank was P-3, comparable to an army captain, but she "advanced fairly rapidly," as she recalled, to P-5: "the equivalent of a major." Major General Courtney Whitney valued Hadley's work on his staff so much that when she considered returning to the United States in order to accept a fellowship from the American Association of University Women (AAUW), he wrote to the association to request they allow Hadley to defer the fellowship for a year, which the AAAUW granted. In the meantime, Hadley researched for her dissertation in what spare time she had.

In the latter half of 1947, however, anticommunist fears became more prominent in American society, and domestic politics shifted against economic democratization. Businessmen and conservatives in government, such as senator William Knowland, criticized the deconcentration program, and SCAP eventually pursued a "reverse course" on economic reforms. Concurrently, Major General Charles Willoughby, the ultraconservative chief of SCAP's intelligence division and an opponent of the deconcentration program, claimed without basis that there was a "leftist infiltration" in SCAP and investigated Eleanor Hadley without the knowledge of those she worked with, resulting in her blacklisting as an uncleared potential security risk in the eyes of the FBI.

== Post-occupation ==
Hadley left Japan in September 1947, returning to Radcliffe to complete her doctorate, funded by an AAUW fellowship. She finished her program in 1949 with a dissertation titled "Concentrated Business Power in Japan", about zaibatsu before World War II.

After matriculating at Radcliffe, although Hadley received what Kuwayama and Patrick call "an impressive array of offers including academic, nonprofit, and official positions," she instead sought a job in the government because working for SCAP had brought her "professional satisfaction." However, when the CIA recruited her as an analyst, she was denied security clearance and could not be hired. Several other jobs offered to Hadley "disappear[ed]," and she subsequently realized that Willoughby had "blackballed" her such that she could only work on the fringes of government. She did work for President Truman's Commission on Migratory Labor from 1950 to 1951, though only through the recommendation of a SCAP friend who personally knew its executive director, Varden Fuller. The blacklisting was such a demoralizing hit to her reputation that Hadley later reminisced that during this time she "was afraid to get a book out of the library."

When Smith College offered Hadley an appointment in its economics department in 1956, she accepted, leaving government for academia. Hadley taught at Smith from 1956 to 1965, taking 1963 to 1965 off to research in Japan on a Fulbright Fellowship.

In 1965, Washington senator Henry M. Jackson began working to help Hadley clear her name from the blacklist. Hadley finally received security clearance for executive branch jobs in 1966. Willoughby had never had any concrete accusations against her.

Finally cleared for government work, Hadley worked for the U. S. Tariff Commission as an economist from 1967 to 1974. In 1974, comptroller general Elmer B. Staats hired her to work for the General Accounting Office where she became assistant director of the International Division, working until 1981. While working for the government, Hadley finished writing the manuscript of Antitrust in Japan, subsequently published by Princeton University Press in 1970, participated in the interuniversity Japan Economic Seminar, and taught as a lecturer at George Washington University, from 1972 to 1984.

Excerpt from AAS statement on Hadley's Award for Distinguished Contributions

"As a woman in a profession where women are rare, as a Japan specialist in a discipline that disdained country-and-culture analysis, as a dedicated economist subjected to unfair political discrimination, you surmounted every obstacle—firmly, intelligently, and with consummate grace."

— Association for Asian Studies, March 14, 1997

== Later life ==
Hadley retired from her career on the East Coast in 1984, though thereafter she lectured as a visiting scholar at the University of Washington from 1986 to 1994.

In 1986, the Japanese government bestowed upon Hadley the Order of the Sacred Treasure, third degree. A decade later, on March 14, 1997, Hadley received an Award for Distinguished Contributions to Asian Studies from the Association for Asian Studies (AAS).

Hadley died June 1, 2007, at Swedish Medical Center in Seattle. There is a scholarship in her name with Mortar Board: the Eleanor Hadley Scholarship.

== Publications ==
=== Antitrust in Japan ===
Published in 1970 by Princeton University Press, Antitrust in Japan examines the results of the deconcentration program Hadley had participated in by comparing the prewar and postwar economies of Japan to see the impact of zaibatsu dissolution. Hadley examines zaibatsu, keiretsu, kombinato, and subsidiaries, among other structures, as well as how the Japanese government influences the economy. Antitrust advocates for free market economics, and the book generally assumes that American capitalism and its institutions are superior to Japan's economy. Nevertheless, Hadley organizes and productively analyzes the large amount of information on zaibatsu and deconcentration, and she offers multiple novel interpretations, such as on banking group behavior and oligopoly. Amid critical assessments of the Japanese economy, in Antitrust Hadley also sympathizes with Japanese people and admires Japanese culture. Economist George Cyril Allen wrote that Antitrust was "undoubtedly the most comprehensive and authoritative" study on zaibatsu and their dissolution then available to "Western readers." In a reference to Antitrust, political scientist Meredith Woo-Cumings called Hadley a "leading chronicler of the anti-trust experiment in Japan during the Occupation."

=== Selected writings ===
- Hadley, Eleanor (July 1948). "Trust Busting in Japan: Cartels and Government–Business Cooperation". Harvard Business Review. 94 (5): 1064–1084. doi:10.2307/1340689. JSTOR 1340689.
- — (1949). Concentrated Business Power in Japan (PhD thesis). Radcliffe College.
- — (December 14, 1949). "Japan: Competition or Private Collectivism?". Far Eastern Survey. 18 (25): 289–294. doi:10.2307/3024204. JSTOR 3024204.
- — (1970). Antitrust in Japan. Princeton University Press. ISBN 0691041946. OL 5630552M – via Internet Archive. Translated into and published in Japanese by Toyo Keizai as 日本財閥の解体と再編成 (1973).
- — (Winter 1976–77). "'Industrial Organization' by Caves and Uekusa: A Review Essay". Japanese Economic Studies. 5 (2): 64–82. doi:10.2753/JES1097-203X050264.
- — (1980). "U. S. Trade Problems with Particular Reference to Japan". In Hollerman, Leon (ed.). Japan And The United States: Economic And Political Adversaries. Westview Press. pp. 57–78. doi:10.4324/9780429051449-4. ISBN 9780429051449. S2CID 195380294. Reissued (2018). New York: Routledge. ISBN 978-0-367-02158-0.
- — (1981). Japan's Export Competitiveness in Third World Markets. Washington, D.C.: Export Competitiveness Project, Center for Strategic and International Studies, Georgetown University. ISBN 9780892060290.
- — (March 1982). "Is the U. S.–Japan Trade Imbalance a Problem? Economists Answer 'No,' Politicians 'Yes'". Journal of Northeast Asian Studies. 1 (1): 35–56. doi:10.1007/BF03029982. S2CID 150726735 – via SpringerLink.
- — (September 1982). "Industrial Policy for Competitiveness" (PDF). Journal of Japanese Trade & Industry. pp. 45–49.
- — (1984). "From Deconcentration to Reverse Course in Japan". In Wolfe, Robert (ed.). Americans as Proconsuls: United States Military Government in Germany and Japan, 1944–1952. Carbondale: Southern Illinois University Press. pp. 138–154. ISBN 0-8093-1115-1. OL 3162932M – via Internet Archive.
- — (May–June 1983). "The Secret of Japan's Success". Challenge. Vol. 26, no. 2. pp. 4–10. doi:10.1080/05775132.1983.11470836.
- — (1989). "The Diffusion of Keynesian Ideas in Japan". In Hall, Peter A. (ed.). The Political Power of Economic Ideas: Keynesianism Across Nations. Princeton University Press. pp. 291–310. doi:10.1515/9780691221380-013. ISBN 0-691-07799-1. OL 2054633M – via Internet Archive.
- — With Kuwayama, Patricia Hagan (2003). Memoir of a Trustbuster: A Lifelong Adventure with Japan. Honolulu: University of Hawaiʻi Press. ISBN 0-8248-2589-6. Translated into and published in Japanese by Toyo Keizai as 財閥解体: GHQ エコノミストの回想.

== See also ==
- 1946 in Japan
- Beate Sirota Gordon
- Cold War
- Economy of Japan
- McCarthyism
- New Deal
