= Herbert Walter Fairman =

Egyptologist

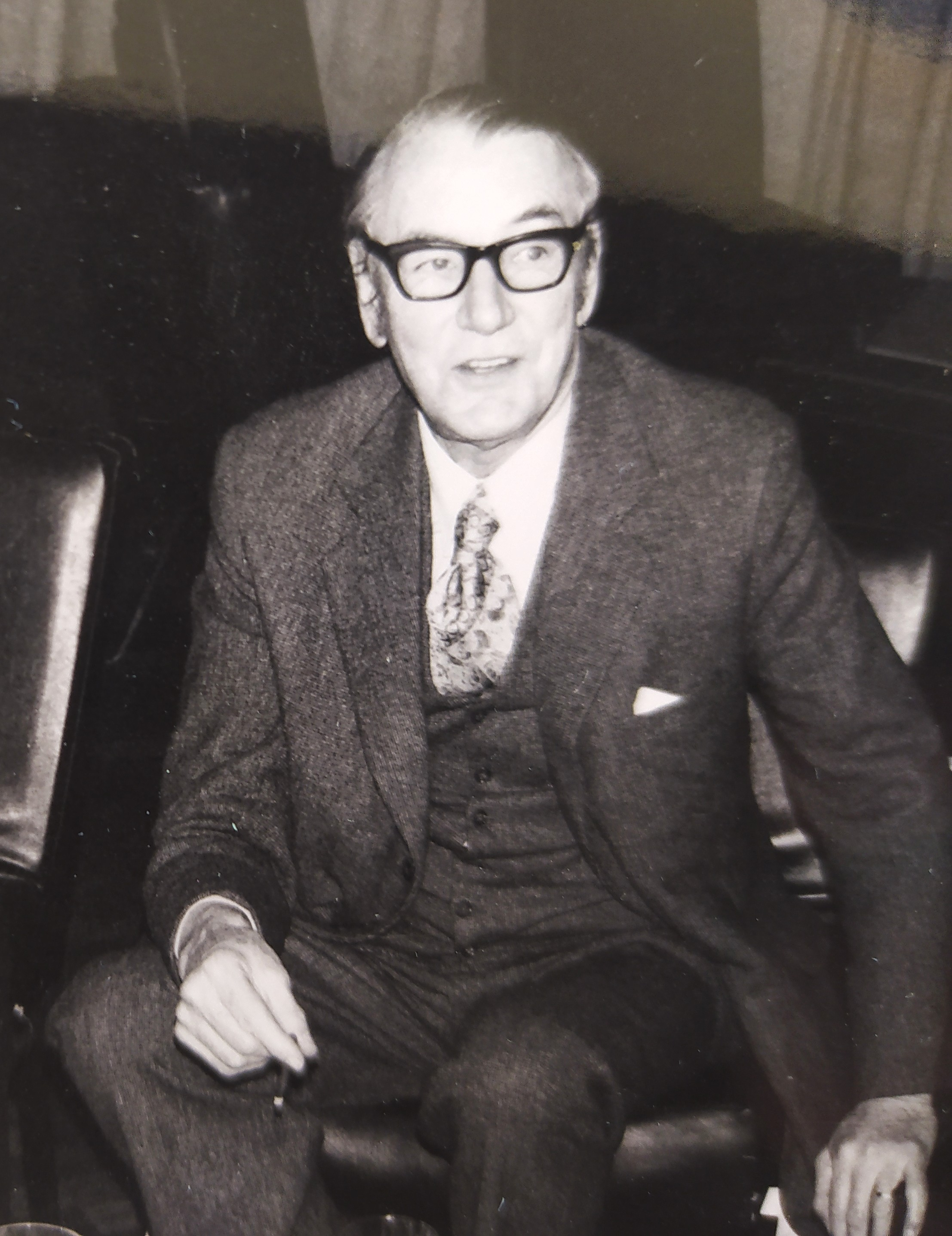
- Fairman at a party thrown by Egyptology students, Liverpool University, for his birthday, March 1972 or 73
- Born: 9 March 1907; Clare, Suffolk
- Died: 16 November 1982 (aged 75)
- Education: University of Liverpool
- Spouse: Olive Winifred Nicholls (m. 1937)
- Scientific career
- Fields: Egyptology
- Workplaces: Egypt Exploration Society; University of Liverpool; University of Manchester

Herbert Walter Fairman (1907 – 1982) was a British Egyptologist. During his career he served as a field director for two excavations in Egypt that were funded by the Egypt Exploration Society.

== Biography ==
Fairman was born on 9 March 1907 in the town of Clare, Suffolk, the fifth of seven children. His mother was Mary Amelia Prior. His father, Walter Trotter Fairman, was a Baptist minister attached to the American Mission at Heliopolis, so in his formative years H.W. Fairman divided his time between England and Egypt. He attended Bethany School, Goudhurst in Kent, then in 1926 went to the Institute of Archaeology in Liverpool to study for a Certificate in Archaeology (Egyptology) under Professors Peet and Garstang, which he gained in 1929.

Fairman worked on multiple archaeological projects in Egypt; at Armant from 1929 to 1931 under Sir Robert Mond, El-Amarnah in 1930 to 1936 as assistant field director under John Pendlebury, at Sesebi from 1936 to 1937 under A.M.Blackman, as field director at Sesebi in 1937-8 and again as field director at Amarah West from 1938 to 1939 and 1947–48.

As a young Egyptologist he worked hard to develop a hieroglyphic hand. He hand-drew a number of hieroglyphic plates in Peet's Great Tomb Robberies, all 72 folio plates in Gardiner's Chester Beatty Papyri, the hieroglyphic transcriptions in Late Egyptian Miscellanies, and those of Pendlebury's The City of Akhenaten.

In 1937 he married Olive Winifred Nicholls.

His work at Amarah West was interrupted by the Second World War, during which Fairman joined the diplomatic service affiliated to the British embassy in Cairo. While working in Cairo, Fairman was known to give lectures on the history of Egypt to Commonwealth soldiers in his spare time. He continued to pursue his Egyptological studies and railed at the unscientific excavation of the Sakkara tombs that he saw at this time.

Following the war, Fairman became the field director of the Egypt Exploration Society and Brunner Professor of Egyptology (1948–1974) at his alma mater, the University of Liverpool. The Institute of Archaeology had now become incorporated into Liverpool University as the School of Archaeology and Oriental Studies. Fairman catalogued the Egyptian and Meroitic collections and organised them into a teaching collection, housed in a small museum in the Archaeology and Oriental Studies building.

From 1948 - 69 he was Special Lecturer in Egyptology at the University of Manchester, from 1956 - 8 Dean of the Faculty of Arts, University of Liverpool and from 1974 - 82 Emeritus Professor.

During his time as Professor, Fairman's publications became fewer as he dedicated himself fully to teaching his students, both under- and post-graduate. Under his leadership, the School acquired an excellent reputation, attracting both British and foreign students. He was so highly thought of by his students and colleagues that they presented him with a volume of studies for his 70th birthday.

He retired from the Chair of Egyptology in 1974, then was granted a one year Honorary Lectureship in Ptolemaic in 1975. Although his intention was to continue his research into the inscriptions of the Temple of Edfu, ill health meant that he was unable to do so. He died on 16 November 1982.

== Publications ==
- Notes on the Date of Some Buchis Stelae JEA Vol 16 No 3/4 (Nov 1930) pp 240–241
- Excavations at Armant, 1929-31 O.H.Myers, H.W.Fairman, JEA Vol 17 No.3/4 (Nov 1931) pp 223–232
- Chapter on the Inscriptions in The City of Akhenaten II, The North Suburb and the Desert Altars (Egypt Exploration Society Excavation Memoirs Vol XL) H. Frankfort, J.D.S. Pendlebury and H.W. Fairman (London 1933)
- A Statue from the Karnak Cache JEA Vol 20 No 1/2 (Jun 1934) pp 1–4
- The Hieroglyphic Inscriptions (ed) in The Bucheum III, Sir Robert Mond and Oliver H.Myers, Forty-First Memoir of the Egypt Exploration Society (London 1934)
- The Myth of Horus at Edfu:I JEA Vol 21, No 1, (Sept 1935) pp 26 – 36
- Topographical Notes on the Central City, Tell El-Amarnah, JEA Vol 21 No 2 (Dec 1935) pp 136–139
- Preliminary Report on the Excavations at Sesebi (Sudla) and Amarah West, Anglo-Egyptian Sudan 1937 - 8, JEA Vol 24 No 2 (Dec 1938) pp 151–156
- Preliminary Report on the Excavations a Amarah West, Anglo-Egyptian Sudan, 1938-9 JEA Vol 25, No 2, (Dec 1939) pp 139–144
- The Myth of Horus at Edfu II.C. The Triumph of Horus over His Enemies: A Sacred Drama A.M.Blackman and H.W.Fairman, JEA Vol 28 (Dec 1942) pp 32–38
- The Myth of Horus at Edfu II.C. The Triumph of Horus over His Enemies a Sacred Drama (Continued) A.M.Blackman and H.W.Fairman, JEA Vol 29 (Dec 1943) pp 2–36
- Notes on the Alphabetic Signs Employed in the Hieroglyphic Inscriptions of the Temple of Edfu, ASAE 43 (1943) pp 191–310
- The Myth of Horus at Edfu II.C. The Triumph of Horus over His Enemies: A Sacred Drama (Concluded) A.M.Blackman and H.W.Fairman, JEA Vol 30 (Dec 1944) p 5–22
- Ptolemaic Notes, ASAE 44 (1944) pp 263–277
- An Introduction to Ptolemaic signs and their values, BIFAO 43 (1945) pp 51–138
- The Consecration of an Egyptian Temple according to the Use of Edfu, A.M.Blackman and H.W.Fairman, JEA Vol 32 (Dec 1946) pp 75–91
- Texts of Hatshepsut and Sethos I inside Speos Artemidos, H.W.Fairman and Bernhard Grdseloff, JEA Vol 33 (Dec 1947) pp 12–33
- Preliminary Report on the Excavations at Amarah West, Anglo-Egyptian Sudan 1947-8, JEA Vol 34 (Dec 1948) pp 3–11
- Town Planning in Pharaonic Egypt, The Town Planning Review Vol 20, No 1 (April 1949) pp 32–51
- The Significance of the Ceremony Hwt Bhsw in the Temple of Horus at Edfu, A.M.Blackman and H.W.Fairman, JEA Vol 35 (Dec 1949) pp 98–112
- The Significance of the Ceremony Hwt Bhsw in the Temple of Horus at Edfu, A.M.Blackman and H.W.Fairman, JEA Vol 36 (Dec 1950) pp 63–81
- Two Ptolemaic Alphabetic Values of ⟨Unknown⟩, JEA Vol 36 (Dec 1950) pp 110–111
- Worship and Festivals in an Egyptian Temple Bulletin of the John Rylands Library, (Manchester 1954) Vol 37 no 1 pp 165–203
- John Garstang: Born 5th May 1876 Anatolian Studies Vol 6 Special Number in Honour and Memory of Professor John Garstang (1956)
- The Supposed Year 21 of Akhenaten, JEA Vol 46 (Dec 1960) pp 108–109
- A Block of Amenophis IV from Athribis, JEA Vol 46 (Dec 1960) pp 80–82
- Once Again the So-Called Coffin of Akhenaten, JEA vol 47 (Dec 1961) pp 25–40
- Two Ptolemaic Numerals, JEA vol 49 (Dec 1963) pp 179–180
- Ancient Egypt and Africa, African Affairs Vol 64 Special Issue: African Studies Association of the United Kingdom, Proceedings of the 1964 Conference (1965) pp 69 – 75
- On the Origin of ⟨Unknown⟩, JEA Vol 54 (Aug 1968) pp 236–238
- The Triumph of Horus: An Ancient Egyptian Sacred Drama (Batsford 1974)

== See also ==
- List of Egyptologists
