= A. F. Shore =

British Egyptologist, academic, and museum curator

- Born: Arthur Frank Shore; 14 November 1924
- Died: 27 November 1994 (aged 70)
- Citizenship: United Kingdom
- Spouse: Patricia (m. 1952)
- Children: Four

Academic background
- Education: King's College, Cambridge

Academic work
- Discipline: Egyptologist
- Sub-discipline: Roman Egypt; Late Antiquity; art of ancient Egypt; archaeology of Ancient Egypt; Christianity in Egypt; Coptic language
- Institutions: King's College, Cambridge; British Museum; University of Liverpool

Arthur Frank "Peter" Shore (14 November 1924 – 27 November 1994) was a British Egyptologist, academic and museum curator, who specialised in Roman Egypt and Late Antiquity. He took degrees in classics and Oriental studies (Egyptology) at the University of Cambridge, before being elected a Fellow of King's College, Cambridge in 1955. He then worked at the British Museum from 1957 to 1974, and was Brunner Professor of Egyptology at the University of Liverpool from 1974 to 1991.

== Early life and education ==
Shore was born on 14 November 1924 in Aldbury, Hertfordshire, England. He was educated at Cardinal Vaughan Memorial School, then a private Catholic school in London. He studied classics at King's College, Cambridge, graduating with a Bachelor of Arts (BA) degree in 1949. His university studies were interrupted by service in the British Army during the Second World War. He then took a second undergraduate degree in Oriental studies, and specialised in Egyptology under Stephen Glanville, achieving first class honours in 1952.

== Career ==
Shore was elected a Fellow of King's College, Cambridge in 1955. He was an assistant keeper at the British Museum from 1957 to 1974, and the Brunner Professor of Egyptology at the University of Liverpool from 1974 to 1991. In retirement, he was chairman of the Egypt Exploration Society.

Shore began his career as a philologist, before moving into the art and material culture of Ancient Egypt. Among his research interests were the Fayum mummy portraits, Christianity in Egypt, and the Coptic language. His only excavation experience was as part of the rescue excavations before the building of the Aswan Dam in the 1960s, and was attached to the Polish team at Faras.

In 1994, a Festschrift was published in his honour titled "The Unbroken Reed: Studies in the Culture and Heritage of Ancient Egypt".

== Personal life ==
Shore was a devout Roman Catholic. Although he always published as A. F. Shore, he was known to friends as Peter. In 1952, he married Patricia (née Tillett). Together they had two sons, two daughters, and, at the time of his death, ten grandchildren.

Shore had periods of ill-health throughout his life, including a bout of tuberculosis that meant he spent months in a sanatorium and lost the use of one lung. Having been seriously ill for months, he died on 27 November 1994, aged 70.

== Selected works ==
- Shore, A. F. (1962). Portrait Painting from Roman Egypt. London: The British Museum.
- Shore, A. F. (1963). Joshua I—VI and Other Passages in Coptic Edited from a Fourth-Century Sahidic Codex in the Chester Beatty Library, Dublin. Chester Beatty Monographs (no. 9). Dublin: Hodges Figgis.
- Shore, A. F. (1971). "Christian and Coptic Egypt". In Harris, J. R. (ed.). The Legacy of Egypt. Oxford: Clarendon Press.
