= Continuous adsorption-regeneration =

Electrochemical regeneration of activated carbon adsorbents such as granular activated carbon present an alternative to thermal regeneration or land filling at the end of useful adsorbent life. Continuous adsorption-electrochemical regeneration encompasses the adsorption and regeneration steps, typically separated in the bulk of industrial processes due to long adsorption equilibrium times (ranging from hours to months), into one continuous system. This is possible using a non-porous, electrically conducting carbon derivative called Nyex. The non-porosity of Nyex allows it to achieve its full adsorptive capacity within a few minutes and its electrical conductivity allows it to form part of the electrode in an electrochemical cell. As a result of its properties Nyex can undergo quick adsorption and fast electrochemical regeneration in a combined adsorption-electrochemical regeneration cell achieving 100% regeneration efficiency.

== Continuous adsorption-regeneration cell ==
The adsorption regeneration process is divided into three key elements which occur in different parts of the cell. All three occur continuously and simultaneously, with parameters such as charge passed, rate of effluent in/outflow and air inlet rate varied according to pollutant type and concentration.

=== Pollutant contacting and adsorption ===
Polluted effluent is added into the bottom of the cell and mixed with the adsorbent in the adsorption zone 1.1 where adsorption of the pollutants onto the surface of the adsorbent occurs. Mixing between the adsorbent and the polluted effluent is promoted by air spargers at the base of the cell which also facilitate the migration of the adsorbent upwards and into the cell's sedimentation zone.

=== Adsorbent-treated effluent separation ===
The adsorbent is separated from the now treated effluent in the sedimentation zone where the density of the adsorbent allows separation by gravitational sedimentation. The treated effluent is allowed to overflow out of the cell.

=== Adsorbent electrochemical regeneration ===
The adsorbent, loaded with adsorbed pollutant on its surface sediments and forms a bed in the regeneration zone in the cell. The mass of the Nyex causes the bed to travel down the regeneration column slowly and eventually pass back into the cell. During the journey down the regeneration column, a DC current is passed across the electrochemical cell of which the adsorbent forms the anode. The applied current causes the pollutants adsorbed on the surface of the Nyex to be electrochemically oxidised regenerating the adsorbent surface restoring its full adsorptive capacity completing the adsorption-regeneration cycle.

== Applications ==
This technology is currently being incorporated into a variety of industries for applications in effluent treatment areas such as:

- Groundwater remediation
- Volatile Organic Compound Removal
- Dye-house Effluent De-Colourisation
- Electrochemical Disinfection
