= C. E. H. Bawn =

British chemist and academic, specialising in chemical kinetics

Cecil Edwin Henry Bawn, CBE, FRS (6 November 1908 – 19 September 2003) was a British chemist and academic, specialising in chemical kinetics. He was Grant-Brunner Professor of Inorganic and Physical Chemistry (1948–1969) and Brunner Professor of Physical Chemistry (1969–1973) at the University of Liverpool. He had previously taught at the University of Manchester and the University of Bristol, before serving at the Ministry of Supply during the Second World War. He was president of the Faraday Society from 1967 to 1968.

== Honours and awards ==
On 20 March 1952, Bawn was elected a Fellow of the Royal Society, the United Kingdom's national academy for the sciences. In the 1956 New Year Honours, he was appointed a Commander of the Order of the British Empire (CBE) in recognition of his work as Grant-Brunner Professor of Inorganic and Physical Chemistry at the University of Liverpool.

Bawn was awarded the Tilden Prize by the Royal Society of Chemistry in 1948. He was awarded the Liversidge Award by the Chemical Society in 1962. He was awarded the Swinburne Gold Medal in 1966.

== Selected works ==
- Bawn, C. E. H. (1948). The chemistry of high polymers. London: Butterworths Scientific Publications.
