= Electrochemical regeneration =

The electrochemical regeneration of activated carbon based adsorbents involves the removal of molecules adsorbed onto the surface of the adsorbent with the use of an electric current in an electrochemical cell restoring the carbon's adsorptive capacity. Electrochemical regeneration represents an alternative to thermal regeneration commonly used in waste water treatment applications. Common adsorbents include powdered activated carbon (PAC), granular activated carbon (GAC) and activated carbon fibre.

== Regeneration for adsorbent re-use ==
In waste water treatment, the most commonly used adsorbent is granular activated carbon (GAC), often used as to treat both liquid and gas phase volatile organic compounds and organic pollutants. Activated carbon beds vary in lifetime depending on the concentration of the pollutant(s) being removed, their associated adsorption isotherms, inlet flow rates and required discharge consents. Life- times of these beds can range between hours and months. Activated carbon is often landfilled at the end of its useful life but sometimes it is possible to regenerate it restoring its adsorptive capacity allowing it to be re-used. Thermal regeneration is the most prolific regeneration technique but has drawbacks in terms of high energy and commercial costs and a significant carbon footprint. These drawbacks have encouraged research into alternative regeneration techniques such as electrochemical regeneration.

== Electrochemically regenerating activated carbons ==
Once the adsorptive capacity of the activated carbon bed has been exhausted by the adsorption of pollutant molecules, the carbon is transferred to an electrochemical cell (to either the anode or the cathode) in which electrochemical regeneration can occur.

=== Principles ===
There are several mechanisms by which passing a current through the electrochemical cell can encourage pollutant desorption. Ions generated at the electrodes can change local pH conditions in the divided cell which affect the adsorption equilibrium and have been shown to promote desorption of organic pollutants such as phenols from the carbon surface. Other mechanisms include reactions between the ions generated and the adsorbed pollutants resulting in the formation of a species with a lower adsorptive affinity for activated carbon that subsequently desorb, or the oxidative destruction of the organics on the carbon surface. It is agreed that the main mechanisms are based on desorption induced regeneration as electrochemical effects are confined to the surface of the porous carbons so cannot be responsible for bulk regeneration. The performance of different regeneration methods can be directly compared using the regeneration efficiency. Some electrochemical methods can reach a regeneration efficiency of over 90%. This is defined as:

$Regeneration\;Efficiency=\frac{adsorptive\;capacity\;of\;activated\;carbon\;after\;adsorption\;and\;electrochemical\;regeneration}{adsorptive\;capacity\;of\;virgin\;activated\;carbon} \times 100$

=== Cathodic regeneration ===
The cathode is the reducing electrode and generates OH^{−} ions which increases local pH conditions. An increase in pH can have the effect of promoting the desorption of pollutants into solution where they can migrate to the anode and undergo oxidation hence destruction. Studies on cathodic regeneration have shown regeneration efficiencies for adsorbed organic pollutants such as phenols of the order of 85% based on regeneration times of 4 hours with applied currents between 10-100 mA. However, due to mass transfer limitations between the cathode and anode, there is often residual pollutant left in the cathode unless large currents or long regeneration times are employed.

=== Anodic regeneration ===
The anode is the oxidising electrode and as a result has a lower localised pH during electrolysis which also promotes desorption of some organic pollutants. Regeneration efficiencies of activated carbon in the anodic compartment are lower than that achievable in the cathodic compartment by between 5-20% for the same regeneration times and currents, however there is no observed residual organic due to the strong oxidising nature of the anode.

=== Repeated adsorption-regeneration ===
For the bulk of carbonaceous adsorbents regeneration efficiency decreases over subsequent cycles as a result of pore blockages and damage to adsorption sites by the applied current. Decreases in regeneration efficiency are typically a further 2% per cycle. Current leading edge research focuses on developing adsorbents able to regenerate 100% of their adsorptive capacity through electrochemical regeneration.

== Commercial systems ==
Currently there are a very limited number of commercially available carbon based adsorption- electrochemical regeneration systems. One system that does exist uses a carbon adsorbent called Nyex in a continuous adsorption-regeneration system that uses electrochemical regeneration to adsorb and destroy organic pollutants.
