= John Bellerby =

British political activist

John Rotherford Bellerby (25 May 1896 – 1 April 1977) was a British economist.

Born in York, Bellerby was educated at Archbishop Holgate's Grammar School, York, the University of Leeds, and Harvard University. He served in World War I with the York Rifles and Machine Gun Corps, becoming a major.

From 1921, Bellerby worked for the International Labour Office in Geneva, in which role he served as secretary of the International Unemployment Conference in 1924. In 1927, he became a fellow of Gonville and Caius College, Cambridge, then in 1930, he transferred to the University of Liverpool, where he held the Brunner Chair of Economic Science.

Bellerby was a supporter of the Labour Party, and stood unsuccessfully for the party in Newark at the 1931 United Kingdom general election, and Cambridgeshire at the 1935 United Kingdom general election. In 1933, he served on the executive of the Fabian Society.

After a period out of academia, Bellerby became a Leverhulme Research Fellow in 1940, then a lecturer at the University of Glasgow in 1942, but spent the remainder of the war working for the Ministry of Food. From 1947, he worked at the Oxford Institute of Agricultural Economics Research, retiring in 1961, though he was a director of Hunter and Smallpage for a few years later in the decade.

Bellerby continued to write in retirement, principally on agriculture and ecology. His last book, Britain in Debt?, was published in 1975, two years before his death.

In 1929, Bellerby married Frances Parker, a poet who became better known as Frances Bellerby. They separated in 1942, and later divorced. In 1961, John Bellerby married Rosalind James.
