= Frances Bellerby =

British poet (1899–1975)

Frances Bellerby (born Mary Eirene Frances Parker; 29 August 1899 – 30 July 1975) was an English poet, novelist and short story writer. "Her poetry is imbued with a spiritual awareness encoded through the natural environment while her political socialism is more evident in her prose".

== Life ==
She was born in 1899, the daughter of an Anglo-Catholic curate in a poor working-class parish of East Bristol. In 1915 she lost her only brother, killed in action in the First World War. She was educated at Mortimer House School, Clifton and in her twenties worked as a kennel-maid, taught English, Latin and games, tutored, and had a staff job in the London office of the Bristol Times and Mirror. In 1929 she married John Rotherford Bellerby, a Cambridge socialist economist. Her 1931 pamphlet Neighbours and the 1932 novel Shadowy Bricks refer to the social and educational experiments carried out by the couple.

After a fall on Lulworth cliffs in 1930 and recurrent ill-health, Frances Bellerby remained a semi-invalid until her death in 1975. She separated permanently from her husband in 1942, and became a serious poet. She settled in Cornwall and later in Devon, producing poetry, short stories, and another novel. During the 1950s she learned she was suffering from breast cancer, but she survived another twenty years, though in poor physical and mental health. Her papers are now held by the library of the University of Exeter. She has written many poems, one of the most famous of which was 'Voices'.

== Works ==
=== Poetry ===
- Plash Mill. London: Peter Davies, 1946.
- The Brightening Cloud and Other Poems. London: Peter Davies, 1949.
- The Stone Angel and the Stone Man. Plymouth, UK: T. Williams, 1958.
- Selected Poems (edited by Charles Causley). London: Enitharmon Press, 1970.
- The Stuttering Water and Other Poems. Gillingham, Kent: A. Ward, 1970.
- The First-Known and Other Poems. London: Enitharmon Press, 1975.
- Selected Poems (edited by Anne Stevenson with an introduction by Robert Gittings). London: Enitharmon Press, 1986.

=== Novels ===
- Shadowy Bricks. London: Richard Clay & Sons, for Educational Services, 1932.
- Hath the Rain a Father? London: Peter Davis, 1946.

=== Short fiction ===
- The Unspoiled (as M.E. Frances Parker). London: Fowler Wright, 1928
- Come to an End and Other Stories. London: Methuen Press, 1939.
- The Acorn and the Cup with Other Stories. London: Peter Davies, 1948.
- A Breathless Child and Other Stories. London: Collins, 1952.
- Selected Stories (edited by Jeremy Hooker). London: Enitharmon Press, 1986.

=== Non-fiction ===
- Perhaps? (as M.E. Frances Parker). London: Fowler Wright, 1927.
- The Neighbours (pamphlet). London: Epworth Press, 1931.

=== Ephemera ===
- A Possible Prayer on New Year's Day. Norfolk, UK: Daedalus Press, for Enitharmon Press, 1972.
