= Desorptive capacity =

Concept in organizational theory

In business administration, desorptive capacity has been defined as "an organization's ability to identify technology transfer opportunities based on a firm's outward technology transfer strategy and to facilitate the technology's application at the recipient". It is considered as a complement to absorptive capacity, and it may be a driver of a successful knowledge transfer.

== The original concept ==
Following the absorptive capacity concept of Cohen and Levinthal (1990), the notion of desorptive capacity was first mentioned as an important capability in an open innovation framework in 2009 and further explicated in an article about interorganizational technology transfer in 2010. The term 'desorptive capacity' follows the terminology of the scientific process of 'desorption' because the process of desorbing is the opposite of absorbing. Like absorptive capacity, desorptive capacity is usually considered as a dynamic capability of an organization, which can be studied at organizational, group and individual level. In particular, it may affect a firm's performance in outward knowledge transfer and, therefore, it may also be a determinant of successful knowledge transfer between two organizations, units or persons. As such, it contributes to examining the entire interorganizational knowledge transfer process from sender to receiver. While prior technological knowledge is a key driver of absorptive capacity, prior market knowledge is a major determinant of desorptive capacity because the knowledge source needs to have some prior understanding about the application at the recipient to effectively transfer knowledge. According to the theoretical concept and subsequent empirical studies, desorptive capacity may determine the potential volume and success of knowledge transfer, and it consists of the two process stages identification and transfer.

== Further applications ==
The distinction of desorptive capacity's process stages identification and transfer has been further detailed as exploratory desorptive capacity and exploitative desorptive capacity. According to this perspective, exploratory desorptive capacity comprises searching for opportunities, monitoring of knowledge and initiation of collaboration, whereas exploitative desorptive capacity refers to customer interaction, organization of knowledge transfer and coordination to reflect on external needs.

Many empirical studies have examined the role, antecedents and consequences of desorptive capacity. In particular, empirical research has shown that desorptive capacity and absorptive capacity actually are complementary and positively affect a firm's performance as well as knowledge transfer success, network and supply chain management and open innovation outcomes. Beyond knowledge transfer of companies, desorptive capacity is positively associated with university technology transfer. Besides market knowledge, several other antecedents and drivers of an organization's level of desorptive capacity have been identified, including leadership, management innovation, ambidexterity and the individual attitudes of an organization's members, such as Not-Sold-Here attitudes.

The importance of desorptive capacity further increases in light of the megatrends of digital transformation and sustainability. Digitalization strengthens the role of innovation ecosystems with a high importance of knowledge sharing. In a similar vein, sustainability management often focuses on environmental sustainability and reducing emissions, which also requires increasing attention to the source of knowledge, products etc.

== See also ==
- Absorptive capacity
- Desorption
- Innovation
- Open innovation
- Knowledge transfer
- Knowledge sharing
