= Harpoon reaction =

Redox reaction in which an electron jumps between both reagents

A harpoon reaction or harpoon mechanism is a type of chemical reaction that involves two neutral reactants undergoing an electron transfer over a relatively long distance to form ions that then attract each other closer together. The initial electron-transfer is a thermally- or photochemically-induced redox reaction. The subsequent ionic combination begins as a result of Coulombic forces. For example, a metal atom and a halogen might react by this type of reaction mechanism to form a cation and anion, respectively, which then form an associated salt of the metal halide. It was first proposed by Michael Polanyi in 1920.

The main feature of these redox reactions is that, unlike most reactions, they have steric factors greater than unity; that is, they take place reaction rate faster than predicted by collision theory. This is explained by the fact that the colliding particles have greater cross sections than the pure geometrical ones calculated from their radii, because when the particles are close enough, an electron "jumps" (analogous to firing a harpoon weapon) from one of the particles to the other one, forming an anion and a cation. Harpoon reactions usually take place in the gas phase, but they are also possible in condensed media.

The accuracy of predicted rate constants can be improved by using a better estimation of the steric factor. A rough approximation is that the largest separation R_{x} at which charge transfer can take place on energetic grounds can be estimated from the solution of the following equation that determines the largest distance at which the Coulombic attraction between the two oppositely charged ions is sufficient to provide the energy $\Delta E_0$.

$\frac{-q_e^2}{R_x}+\Delta E_0 = 0$

With $\Delta E_0 = E_i - E_{ea}$, where $E_{i}$ is the ionization potential of the metal and $E_{ea}$ is the electron affinity of the halogen.

== Examples ==
- Generically: Rg + X_{2} + hν → RgX + X, where Rg is a rare gas and X is a halogen
- Ba...FCH_{3} + hν → BaF^{(*)} + CH_{3}
- K + CH_{3}I → KI + CH_{3}
