= Max Trautz =

Max Trauts
- Born: 19 April 1880; Karlsruhe, German Empire
- Died: 19 August 1960 (aged 80); Karlsruhe, West Germany
- Education: University of Karlsruhe
- Known for: Collision Theory
- Scientific career
- Fields: Chemistry
- Workplaces: University of Karlsruhe; University of Heidelberg
- Doctoral students: Walter Weizel

Max Trautz (19 March 1880 – 19 August 1960) was a German chemist. He was very productive with over 190 scientific publications especially in the field of chemical kinetics. He was the first to investigate the activation energy of molecules by connecting Max Planck's new results concerning light with observations in chemistry.

He is also known as the founder of collision theory together with the British scientist William Lewis. While Trautz published his work in 1916, Lewis published it in 1918. However, they were unaware of each other's work due to World War I.

== Publications ==
- Trautz, Max. Der Temperaturkoeffizient der spezifischen Wärme von Gasen, 1913
- Trautz, Max. Die Theorie der chemischen Reaktionsgeschwindigkeit und ein neues Grenzgesetz für ideale Gase, 1915
- Trautz, Max. Messungen der spezifischen Wärme von Co 2, Cl 2 und So 2, 1916
- Trautz, Max. Das Gesetz der Reaktionsgeschwindigkeit und der Gleichgewichte in Gasen. Bestätigung der Additivität von Cv-3/2R. Neue Bestimmung der Integrationskonstanten und der Moleküldurchmesser, Zeitschrift für anorganische und allgemeine Chemie, Volume 96, Issue 1, Pages 1 – 28, 1916
- Trautz, Max. Die Theorie der Gasreaktionen und der Molarwärmen und die Abweichungen von der Additivität der inneren Atomenergie, 1917
- Trautz, Max. Praktische Einführung in die Allgemeine Chemie, 1917
- Trautz, Max. Der Verlauf der chemischen Vorgänge im Dunkeln und im Licht, 1917.
- Trautz, Max. Die Einwirkung von Stickoxyd auf Chlor
- Trautz, Max. Die langsame Verbrennung des Jodwasserstoffgases
- Trautz, Max. Die Reibung, Wärmeleitung und Diffusion in Gasmischungen
- Trautz, Max. Lehrbuch der Chemie
