= Toni Townes-Whitley =

American businesswoman

- Born: Toni Yvette McCall; Fort Benning, Georgia, U.S.
- Education: Princeton University; Wharton School Executive Education; New York University
- Occupations: Businesswoman; Global technology leader
- Spouse: John H. Whitley
- Children: 5
- Parents: LTG (Ret.) James F. McCall (father); S. Yvonne McCall (mother)

Toni Townes-Whitley is a global technology leader who is the third Black female Fortune 500 CEO, and the first to lead a defense industry corporation. She was the CEO of Science Applications International Corporation (SAIC) from 2023 to 2025. Prior to joining SAIC, she served as a group president at Microsoft and managed $16 billion in revenue.

== Early life and education ==
Toni Townes-Whitley (née McCall) was born in Fort Benning, Georgia, and raised in Virginia. Her father is LTG (Ret.) James F. "Cash" McCall, who was the first Black Comptroller of the US Army. Her mother is S. Yvonne McCall, a former Fairfax County, Virginia elementary school principal. She was raised with her brother.

In 1985, Townes-Whitley earned her bachelor’s degree in public policy and economics from Princeton School of Public and International Affairs.

In addition to Princeton, Townes-Whitley has attended and received certifications from Wharton Executive Education, New York University, and the Performance Management Institute.

== Career ==
Townes-Whitley began her career as a Peace Corps teacher in Gabon, West Africa. She worked as a policy analyst with the General Accounting Office. For six years, she was a stay-at-home mother, and returned to work in 1997.

She was a program and budget analyst for the public school system in Washington, D.C. After that, she joined the government affairs office of Arthur Andersen, an international accounting firm, as a management consultant. Later, she served as vice president for global public sector, system integration, and consulting at Unisys; and vice president and managing partner for Unisys Global Industries in North America.

In 2010, Townes-Whitley was appointed senior vice president, Civilian Agency Programs (CAP), for CGI Federal, a government IT consulting firm, and served in that role for a few years. In 2014, she was named chief operating officer. For a brief period, she served as CGI's president.

In 2015, Townes-Whitley joined Microsoft as corporate vice president for global industry. Four years later, she was promoted to president of U.S. regulated industries. During her eight year tenure at Microsoft, she led initiatives focused on corporate responsibility. Additionally, she oversaw initiatives related to corporate responsibility, including sustainability and artificial intelligence governance. She also worked to promote gender diversity and support women seeking corporate board roles within the company. In late 2019, Microsoft was awarded a $10-billion U.S. Department of Defense cloud computing contract.

In 2023, Townes-Whitley was named CEO of Science Applications International Corporation (SAIC), a technology company based in Reston, Virginia. SAIC specializes in providing engineering, digital, and artificial intelligence solutions primarily for government agencies, including national defense and space entities such as the United States Army, Navy, and Space Force, as well as various branches of the federal government. In October 2025, Townes-Whitley stepped down as CEO of SAIC.

Townes-Whitley serves as guest lecturer on technology, ethics and entrepreneurism in the public sector at Stanford and Princeton Universities.

== Personal ==
Townes-Whitley is married to John H. Whitley, and the couple have five children and nine grandchildren. Her first marriage to John Townes produced two children (a son and a daughter) and ended in divorce.

== Affiliations and board memberships ==
Townes-Whitley is affiliated with public corporations, non-profit institutions, and other organizations. She serves or has served on the board of directors for Johns Hopkins Medicine, Marathon Petroleum Corporation, Mothers at Home, NASDAQ, Partnership for Public Service, PNC Financial, Princeton University Faith and Work Initiative, and Thurgood Marshall College Fund.

== Honors and awards ==
Townes-Whitley has been a recipient of award such as Fortune’s Most Powerful Women: Ones to Watch, Women in Technology Leadership, Black Enterprise Top Executive, Federal 100 Industry Eagle Award, NVTC Tech 100 Executive, FedScoop Top50 for Industry Leadership, 2020 IES Lifetime Achievement Award and “Woman of the Year” by the Washington-based STEM.
