= George Cyril Allen =

English economist (1900–1982)

Allen in September 1965.

George Cyril Allen (28 June 1900 – 31 July 1982), published as G. C. Allen, was a British economist and academic. He was Brunner Professor of Economic Science at the University of Liverpool from 1933 to 1947, and then Professor of Political Economy at University College London from 1947 to 1967. He wrote on Japanese and British industrial policy.

== Life ==
Allen was born in Kenilworth, Warwickshire. After education at King Henry VIII School, Coventry he briefly joined at the Royal Air Force in 1918 before studying at the University of Birmingham. There he studied under William Ashley, graduating B.Com in 1921 and M.Com in 1922. From 1922 to 1925 he taught economics at the Higher Commercial School in Nagoya, Japan. Returning to Birmingham, Allen gained a PhD in 1928 with a thesis which was published the following year as The Industrial Development of Birmingham and the Black Country. He became professor of economics at the University College of Hull in 1929, and Brunner Professor of Economic Science at the University of Liverpool in 1933. In 1947 he became Professor of Political Economy at University College London.

His papers are held at University College London.

== Works ==
- Modern Japan and its problems, 1927
- The industrial development of Birmingham and the Black Country, 1860-1927, 1929
- British industries and their organization, 1933
- Japan: the hungry guest, 1938
- Japanese industry: its recent development and present condition, 1939
- (with Elizabeth Boody Schumpeter) The industrialization of Japan and Manchuko, 1930-1940: population, raw materials and industry, 1940
- A short economic history of modern Japan, 1867-1937, 1946
- (with Audrey Donnithorne) Western enterprise in Far Eastern economic development: China and Japan, 1954
- (with Audrey Donnithorne) Western enterprise in Indonesia and Malaya: a study in economic development, 1957
- Japan's economic recovery, 1958
- A short economic history of modern Japan, 1958
- The structure of industry in Britain: a study in economic change, 1961
- Japan's economic expansion, 1965
- Monopoly and restrictive practices, 1968
- The British disease : a short essay on the nature and causes of the nation's lagging wealth, 1979
- The Japanese economy, 1981
- Appointment in Japan: memories of sixty years, 1983
