= William Lewis (physical chemist) =

British chemist and academic

William Cudmore McCullagh Lewis, FRS (29 June 1885 – 11 February 1956) was a British chemist and academic. He was Brunner Professor of Physical Chemistry at the University of Liverpool.

== Biography ==
Lewis was born in Belfast, the son of linen merchant Edward Lewis and his wife Francis Welsh McCullagh. He was educated at Bangor Grammar School. Co. Down and the Royal University of Ireland, Belfast where he studied physics and chemistry. After gaining an MA degree in 1906, he was a demonstrator for a year and then moved to England to do research in physical chemistry at the University of Liverpool. There he was awarded a scholarship to work at Heidelberg University for a year.

Lewis was appointed Brunner Professor of Physical Chemistry in 1913 (until 1937, when it was merged with the Grant chair of Inorganic Chemistry). In 1918 he propounded his theory of chemical reaction which came to be called the "Collision Theory". A similar theory was also propounded by Max Trautz in Germany in 1916, unbeknown to Lewis because of the first World War.

In 1926 Lewis was elected a Fellow of the Royal Society. His candidature citation described him thus:

Distinguished for his researches in physical chemistry. Has carried out most valuable and important investigations on the energy relationship of chemical change and was one of the first to apply the energy quantum theory to chemical reaction. His pioneer work in this field has proved to be of great value and has opened up a very promising field of research. Author of: - 'A System of Physical Chemistry.' Has published a large number of original papers on many problems in physical chemistry in addition to a long series of papers on the radiation theory of reaction.

He was appointed the first Grant-Brunner Professor of Inorganic and Physical Chemistry in 1937, holding the position until 1948.

Lewis died in Malvern in 1956. He had married Jeannie Waterson Darrock, with whom he had one child, Ian, who became a physicist at Harwell Atomic Energy Research Establishment.
