= Gerry George =

British business professor

Academic background
- Education: Birla Institute of Technology & Science, Pilani

Academic work
- Discipline: Strategy, management
- Sub-discipline: Entrepreneurship, business model, grand challenges
- Institutions: Georgetown University

Gerard "Gerry" George is currently professor at the McDonough School of Business at Georgetown University. Previously, he was dean and Lee Kong Chian Chair Professor of Innovation and Entrepreneurship at the Lee Kong Chian School of Business at Singapore Management University.

== Academic career ==
Before joining Singapore Management University, George was a professor at Imperial College London, London Business School and the University of Wisconsin–Madison. He is an alumnus of Birla Institute of Technology & Science, Pilani.

At Imperial College Business School, he was the founding director of Gandhi Centre for Inclusive Innovation at Imperial College London. The centre was launched in December 2007 at Mumbai to facilitate research, technology and educational partnerships between Imperial College and Indian organisations and businesses. He helped launch the BML Munjal University and serves on its Board of Governors. He retains the position of visiting professor at the innovation and entrepreneurship group at Imperial College Business School.

George was also the Academic Director of the London Stock Exchange's Elite Programme to promote British growth entrepreneurs to scale up their businesses. The programme was launched by Minister of State for Skills and Enterprise, Matt Hancock MP. In 2010, he was awarded a prestigious Professorial Fellowship by the UK's Economic and Social Research Council for his research on low cost innovation and inclusive growth. From 2007 to 2009, he was an Innovation Fellow of the Advanced Institute of Management Research. He conducts executive development programmes on innovation. For his work in India and Africa on inclusive innovation, he was conferred the honorary title of fellow of the City and Guilds of London Institute in 2015. He was awarded honorary doctorate in economic sciences for outstanding scientific achievements in the fields of strategy, innovation and entrepreneurship by the University of St. Gallen, Switzerland.

== Research and editorship ==
George was chief-editor of the Academy of Management Journal, the leading journal in management and business research from 2013 until 2016. This was the first time that the editorship moved to Europe and then to Asia in the journal's 60-year history. In his editor role, he encouraged a rethinking of management scholarship to embrace important organizational and social phenomena rather than an exclusive focus on theory development in order to improve the applicability of management research. His editorials called for researchers to explore grand challenges for management including applications in climate change, aging populations, digital money, design thinking, and big data among others. He is an active advocate of "impact" of management research for policy and practice, especially with a focus on Sustainable Development Goals and positive societal outcomes.

Gerard George has numerous academic papers to his credit on the topics of internationalisation and entrepreneurship, patenting and licensing, open innovation, design, and business models. His work addresses social inclusion and growth through innovation in business models and governance in the context of rural electrification and micro-enterprise development in Africa. He is probably best known for his widely cited co-authored paper on absorptive capacity of firms with Professor Shaker Zahra. Another contribution is on the performance consequences of slack in private firms. He found evidence for the "less is more" philosophy or that 'resource constraints' improves financial performance in small and medium-sized enterprises. George has several books to his credit. 'Inventing Entrepreneurs' focuses on scientists in academic and corporate environments who pursue entrepreneurial careers. 'Models of Opportunity' looks at the business model of growing businesses and how visionary entrepreneurs use narratives of change and aspiration. His recent books include 'The Handbook of Inclusive Innovation', 'The Business Model Book', and 'Managing Natural Resources'.
