= James F. McCall =

American Army general (born 1934)

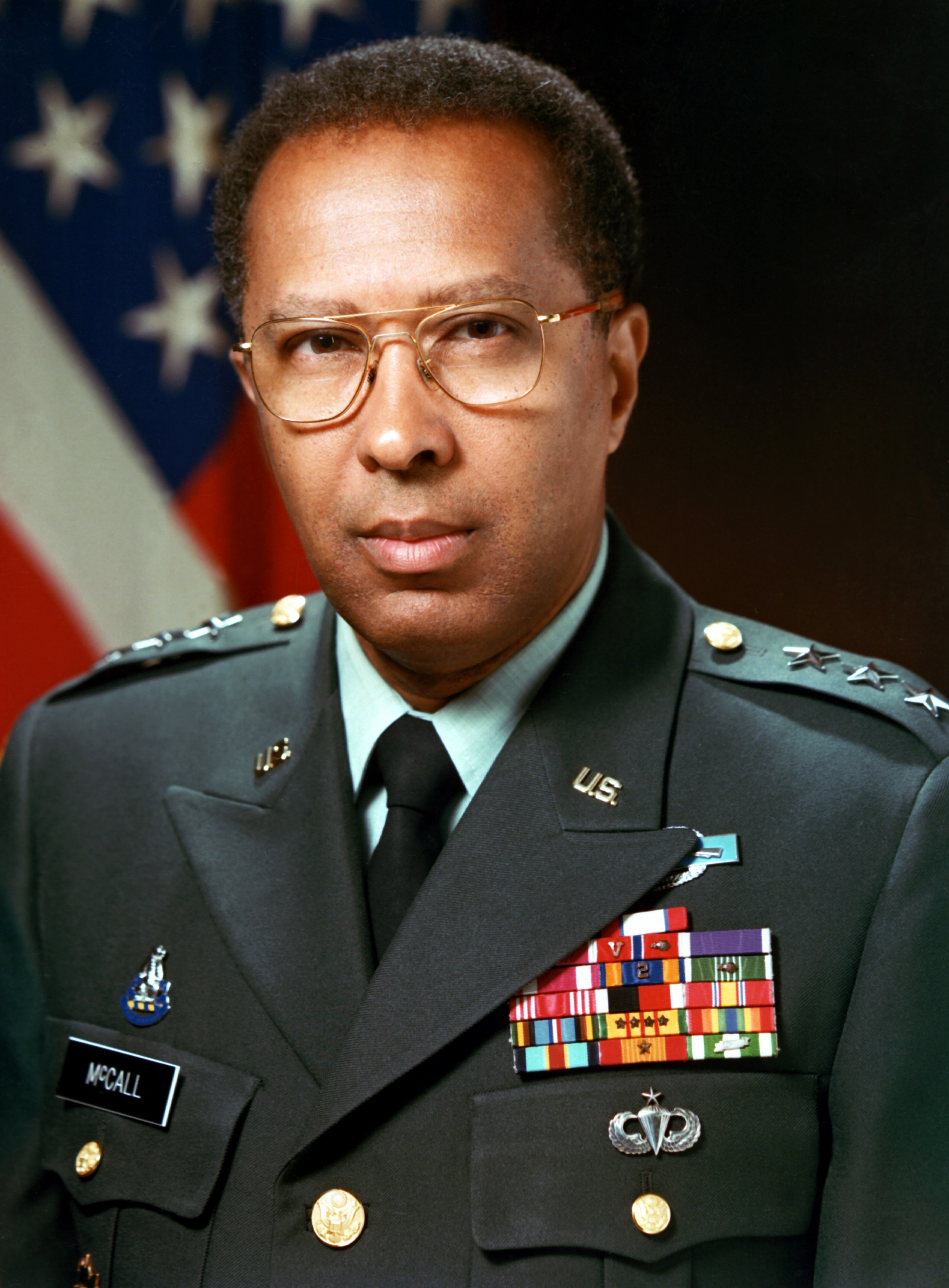
- Born: June 25, 1934 (age 91); Philadelphia, Pennsylvania, US
- Allegiance: United States of America
- Branch: United States Army
- Service years: 1956–1991
- Rank: Lieutenant general
- Commands: Comptroller of the United States Army; 4th Training Brigade, United States Army Armor School; 1st Battalion, 31st Infantry Regiment
- Conflicts: Vietnam War
- Awards: Distinguished Service Medal; Legion of Merit (2); Bronze Star Medal (2); Purple Heart; Meritorious Service Medal; Air Medal (2)

James Franklin McCall (born June 25, 1934) is a retired United States Army lieutenant general who served as Comptroller of the United States Army from 1988 to 1991.

== Education ==
General McCall is a 1956 graduate of the University of Pennsylvania with a B.S. degree in economics from the Wharton School. McCall later earned a master's degree in military science from the Army Command and General Staff College and an M.B.A. in comptrollership from Syracuse University. He is also a graduate of the Industrial College of the Armed Forces.

== Personal ==
He is the father of Toni Townes-Whitley, a Fortune 500 CEO.
