= Pre-exponential factor =

Numerical constant in the Arrhenius equation in chemical kinetics

In chemical kinetics, the pre-exponential factor or A factor is the pre-exponential constant in the Arrhenius equation (equation shown below), an empirical relationship between temperature and rate coefficient. It is usually designated by A when determined from experiment, while Z is usually left for collision frequency. The pre-exponential factor can be thought of as a measure of the frequency of properly oriented collisions. It is typically determined experimentally by measuring the rate constant $k$ at a particular temperature and fitting the data to the Arrhenius equation. The pre-exponential factor is generally not exactly constant, but rather depends on the specific reaction being studied and the temperature at which the reaction is occurring.

$A=\frac{k}{e^{-\frac{E_a}{RT}}}=ke^{\frac{E_a}{RT}}$

The units of the pre-exponential factor A are identical to those of the rate constant and will vary depending on the order of the reaction. For a first-order reaction, it has units of s^{−1}. For that reason, it is often called frequency factor.

According to collision theory, the frequency factor, A, depends on how often molecules collide when all concentrations are 1 mol/L and on whether the molecules are properly oriented when they collide. Values of A for some reactions can be found at Collision theory.

According to transition state theory, A can be expressed in terms of the entropy of activation of the reaction.
