= Collision frequency =

Physics calculation for collisions

Collision frequency describes the rate of collisions between two atomic or molecular species in a given volume, per unit time. In an ideal gas, assuming that the species behave like hard spheres, the collision frequency between entities of species A and species B is
$$Z = N_\text{A} N_\text{B} \sigma_\text{AB} \sqrt\frac{8 k_\text{B} T}{\pi \mu_\text{AB}},$$
where

$N_\text{A}$ is the number of A particles in the volume,
$N_\text{B}$ is the number of B particles in the volume,
$\sigma_\text{AB}$ is the collision cross section, the "effective area" seen by two colliding molecules (for hard spheres, $\sigma_\text{AB} = \pi(r_\text{A} + r_\text{B})^2$, where $r_\text{A}$ is the radius of A, and $r_\text{B}$ is the radius of B),
$k_\text{B}$ is the Boltzmann constant,
$T$ is the thermodynamic temperature,
$\mu_\text{AB} = \frac{m_\text{A} m_\text{B}}{m_\text{A} + m_\text{B}}$ is the reduced mass of A and B particles.

== Collision in diluted solution ==
In the case of equal-size particles at a concentration $n$ in a solution of viscosity $\eta$, an expression for collision frequency $Z = V\nu$, where $V$ is the volume in question, and $\nu$ is the number of collisions per second, can be written as
$$\nu = \frac{8 k_\text{B} T}{3 \eta} n,$$
where

$k_B$ is the Boltzmann constant,
$T$ is the absolute temperature,
$\eta$ is the viscosity of the solution,
$n$ is the number density.

Here the frequency is independent of particle size, a result noted as counter-intuitive. For particles of different size, more elaborate expressions can be derived for estimating $\nu$.
