= Connectivity theorems =

The stoichiometric structure and mass-conservation properties of biochemical pathways gives rise to a series of theorems or relationships between the control coefficients and the control coefficients and elasticities. There are a large number of such relationships depending on the pathway configuration (e.g. linear, branched or cyclic) which have been documented and discovered by various authors. The term theorem has been used to describe these relationships because they can be proved in terms of more elementary concepts. The operational proofs in particular are of this nature.

The most well known of these theorems are the summation theorems for the control coefficients and the connectivity theorems which relate control coefficients to the elasticities. The focus of this page are the connectivity theorems.

When deriving the summation theorems, a thought experiment was conducted that involved manipulating enzyme activities such that concentrations were unaffected but fluxes changed. The connectivity theorems use the opposite thought experiment, that is enzyme activities are changed such that concentrations change but fluxes are unchanged. This is an important observation that highlights the orthogonal nature of these two sets of theorem.

As with the summation theorems, the connectivity theorems can also be proved using more rigorous mathematical approaches involving calculus and linear algebra. Here the more intuitive and operational proofs will be used to prove the connectivity theorems.

== Statement of the connectivity theorems ==
Two basic sets of theorems exists, one for flux and another for concentrations. The concentration connectivity theorems are divided again depending on whether the system species $S_n$ is different from the local species $S_m$.

$$\sum_i C^J_i \varepsilon^i_s = 0$$

$$\sum_i C^{s_n}_i \varepsilon^i_{s_m} = 0 \quad n \neq m$$

$$\sum_i C^{s_n}_i \varepsilon^i_{s_m} = -1 \quad n = m$$

== Proof ==
The operational proof for the flux connectivity theorem relies on making perturbations to enzyme levels such that the pathway flux is unchanged but a single metabolite level is changed. This can be illustrated with the following pathway:

$\stackrel{v_1}{\longrightarrow} S_1 \stackrel{v_2}{\longrightarrow} S_2 \stackrel{v_3}{\longrightarrow} S_3 \stackrel{v_4}{\longrightarrow}$

Let us make a change to the rate through $v_2$ by increasing the concentration of enzyme $e_2$. Assume $e_2$ is increased by an amount, $\delta e_2$. This will result in a change to the steady-state of the pathway. The concentrations of $s_2, s_3$, and the flux, $J$ through the pathway will increase, and the concentration of $s_1$ will decrease because it is upstream of the disturbance.

Impose a second change to the pathway such that the flux, $J$ is restored to what it was before the original change. Since the flux increased when $e_2$ was changed, the flux can be decreased by decreasing one of the other enzyme levels. If the concentration of $e_3$ is decreased, this will reduce the flux. Decreasing $e_3$ will also cause the concentration of $s_2$ to further increase. However, $s_1$ and $s_3$ will change in the opposite direction compared to when $e_2$ was increased.

When $e_3$ is sufficiently changed so that the flux is restored to its original value, the concentrations of $s_1$ and $s_3$ will also be restored to their original values. It is only $s_2$ that will differ. This is true because the flux through $v_1$ is now the same as it was originally (since we’ve restored the flux), and $e_1$ has not been manipulated in any way. This means that the concentration of $s_1$ and all species upstream of $s_1$ must be the same as they were before the modulations occurred. The same arguments apply to $s_3$ and all species downstream of $v_4$.

The net result is that $e_2$ has been increased by $\delta e_2$ resulting a change in flux of $\delta J$. The concentration of $e_3$ was decreased such that the flux was restored to it original value, $\delta J = 0$. In the process, $s_2$ changed by $\delta s_2$ but neither $s_1$ or $s_3$. In fact no other species in the entire system has changed other than $s_2$.

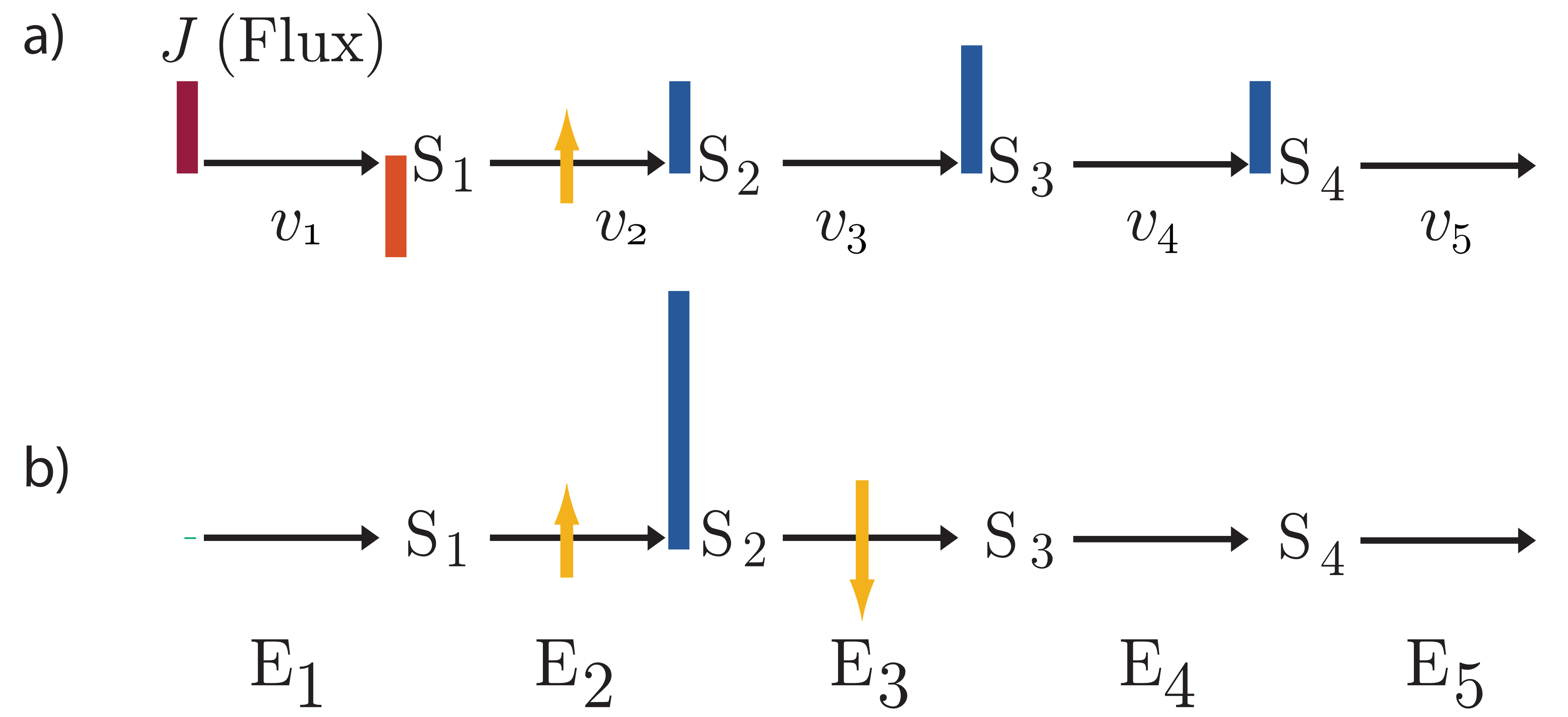
Perturbations involved in the connectivity theorem. a) First perturbation (orange) at step 2; b) Second counter perturbation at step 3, resulting in no change in flux, J but a change to species S2. No other species changes

This thought experiment can be expressed mathematically as follows. The system equations in terms of the flux control coefficients can be written as:

$\frac{\delta J}{J} = 0 = C^J_2 \frac{\delta e_2}{e_2} + C^J_3 \frac{\delta e_3}{e_3}$

There are only two terms because only $e_2$ and $e_3$ were changed.

The local change at each step can be written for $v_2$ and $v_2$ in terms of elasticities:

$0 = \frac{\delta v_2}{v_2} = \frac{\delta e_2}{e_2} + \varepsilon^2_2 \frac{\delta s_2}{s_2}$

$0 = \frac{\delta v_3}{v_3} = \frac{\delta e_3}{e_3} + \varepsilon^3_2 \frac{\delta s_2}{s_2}$

Note that $\delta e_2/e_2$ won't necessarily equal $\delta e_2/e_3$ and by construction both rates, $v_2$ and $v_3$ showed no change. Also by construction only $s_2$ changed.

The local equation can be rearranged as:

$\frac{\delta e_2}{e_2}=-\varepsilon_2^2 \frac{\delta s_2}{s_2}$

$\frac{\delta e_3}{e_3}=-\varepsilon_2^3 \frac{\delta s_2}{s_2}$

The right-hand sides can be inserted into the system equation the change in flux:

$0=\frac{\delta J}{J}=-\left(C_{e_2}^J \varepsilon_2^2 \frac{\delta s_2}{s_2}+C_{e_3}^J \varepsilon_2^3 \frac{\delta s_2}{s_2}\right)$

Therefore:

$0=\frac{\delta s_2}{s_2}\left(C_{e_2}^J \varepsilon_2^2+C_{e_3}^J \varepsilon_2^3\right)$

However, by construction of the perturbations, $\delta s_2/s_2$ does not equal zero, hence we arrive at the connectivity theorem:

$0=C_{e_2}^J \varepsilon_2^2+C_{e_3}^J \varepsilon_2^3$

The operational method can also be used for systems where a given metabolite can influence multiple steps. This would apply to cases such as branched systems or systems with negative feedback loops.

The same approach can be used to derive the concentration connectivity theorems except one can consider either the case that focuses on a single species or a second case where the system equation is written to consider the effect on a distance species.

== Interpretation ==
The flux control coefficient connectivity theorem is the easiest to understand. Starting with a simple two step pathway:

$X_o \stackrel{v_1}{\longrightarrow} S_1 \stackrel{v_2}{\longrightarrow} X_1$

where $X_o$ and $X_1$ are fixed species so that the pathway can reach a steady-state. $v_1$ and $v_2$ are the reaction rates for the first and second steps.

We can write the flux connectivity theorem for this simple system as follows:

$C^J_1 \varepsilon^1_1 + C^J_2 \varepsilon^2_1 = 0$

where $\varepsilon^1_1$ is the elasticity of the first step $v_1$ with respect to the species $S_1$ and $\varepsilon^2_1$ is the elasticity of the second step $v_2$ with respect to the species $S_1$. It is easier to interpret the equation with a slight rearrangement to the following form:

$\frac{C^J_1}{C^J_2} = -\frac{\varepsilon^2_1}{\varepsilon^1_1}$

The equation indicates that the ratio of the flux control coefficients is inversely proportional to the elasticities. That is, a high flux control coefficient on step one is associated with a low elasticity $\varepsilon^1_1$ and vice versa. Likewise a high value for the flux control coefficient on step two is associated with a low elasticity $\varepsilon^2_1$.

This can be explained as follows: If $\varepsilon^1_1$ is high (in absolute terms, since it is negative) then a change at $v_1$ will be resisted by the elasticity, hence the flux control coefficient on step one will be low.

== See also ==
- Branched pathways
- Control coefficient (biochemistry)
- Elasticity coefficient
- Metabolic control analysis
- Summation theorems (biochemistry)
