= Response coefficient (biochemistry) =

Biochemical pathway response measurement

Control coefficients measure the response of a biochemical pathway to changes in enzyme activity. The response coefficient, as originally defined by Kacser and Burns, is a measure of how external factors such as inhibitors, pharmaceutical drugs, or boundary species affect the steady-state fluxes and species concentrations. The flux response coefficient is defined by:

$R_x^J=\frac{d J}{d x} \frac{x}{J}$

where $J$ is the steady-state pathway flux. Similarly, the concentration response coefficient is defined by the expression:

$R_x^s=\frac{d s}{d x} \frac{x}{s}$

where in both cases $x$ is the concentration of the external factor. The response coefficient measures how sensitive a pathway is to changes in external factors other than enzyme activities.

The flux response coefficient is related to control coefficients and elasticities through the following relationship:

$R_x^J=\sum_{i=1}^n C_{e_i}^J \varepsilon_x^{v_i}$

Likewise, the concentration response coefficient is related by the following expression:

$R_x^s=\sum_{i=1}^n C_{e_i}^s \varepsilon_x^{v_i}$

The summation in both cases accounts for cases where a given external factor, $x$, can act at multiple sites. For example, a given drug might act on multiple protein sites. The overall response is the sum of the individual responses.

These results show that the action of an external factor, such as a drug, has two components:

1. The elasticity indicates how potent the drug is at affecting the activity of the target site itself.
2. The control coefficient indicates how any perturbation at the target site will propagate to the rest of the system and thereby affect the phenotype.

When designing drugs for therapeutic action, both aspects must therefore be considered.

== Proof of Response Theorem ==
There are various ways to prove the response theorems:

=== Proof by perturbation ===
The perturbation proof by Kacser and Burns is given as follows.

Given the simple linear pathway catalyzed by two enzymes $e_1$ and $e_2$:

$X \stackrel{e_1}\longrightarrow S \stackrel{e_2}\longrightarrow$

where $X$ is the fixed boundary species. Let us increase the concentration of enzyme $e_1$ by an amount $\delta e_1$. This will cause the steady state flux and concentration of $S$, and all downstream species beyond $e_2$ to increase. The concentration of $X$ is now decreased such that the flux and steady-state concentration of $S$ is restored back to their original values. These changes allow one to write down the following local and systems equations for the changes that occurred:

$\begin{array}{r} \left. \dfrac{\delta v_1}{v_1} = \varepsilon_x^1 \dfrac{\delta x}{x}+\varepsilon_{e_1}^1 \dfrac{\delta e_1}{e_1} = 0 \right\} \text { Local equation } \\[5pt] \left. \dfrac{\delta J}{J} = R_x^J \dfrac{\delta x}{x}+C_{e_1}^J \dfrac{\delta e_1}{e_1}=0 \right\} \text { System equation } \end{array}$

There is no $s$ term in either equation because the concentration of $s$ is unchanged. Both right-hand sides of the equations are guaranteed to be zero by construction. The term $\delta e_1/e_1$ can be eliminated by combining both equations. If we also assume that the reaction rate for an enzyme-catalyzed reaction is proportional to the enzyme concentration, then $\varepsilon_{e_1}^1=1$, therefore:

$0=R_x^J \frac{\delta x}{x}-C_{e_1}^J \varepsilon_x^1 \frac{\delta x}{x}$

Since $\delta e_1/e_1 \neq 0$

this yields:

$R_x^J=C_{e_1}^J \varepsilon_x^1$.

This proof can be generalized to the case where $X$ may act at multiple sites.

=== Pure algebraic proof ===
The pure algebraic proof is more complex and requires consideration of the system equation:

${\bf N} {\bf v} (s (p), p) = 0$

where ${\bf N}$ is the stoichiometry matrix and ${\bf v}$ the rate vector. In this derivation, we assume there are no conserved moieties in the network, but this doesn't invalidate the proof. Using the chain rule and differentiating with respect to $p$ yields, after rearrangement:

$\dfrac{ds}{dp} = \left[ -{\bf N} \dfrac{\partial v}{\partial s} \right]^{-1} \dfrac{\partial v}{\partial p}$

The inverted term is the unscaled control coefficient so that after scaling, it is possible to write:

$R^s_p = C^s_v \varepsilon^v_p$

To derive the flux response coefficient theorem, we must use the additional equation:

${\bf v} = {\bf v} ({\bf s} (p), p)$

== See also ==
- Control coefficient (biochemistry)
- Elasticity coefficient
- Metabolic control analysis
