= Catalog of MCA Control Patterns =

Metabolic control analysis patterns

Jannie Hofmeyr published the first catalog of control patterns in metabolic control analysis (MCA). His doctoral research. concerned the use of graphical patterns to elucidate chains of interaction in metabolic regulation, later published in the European Journal of Biochemistry. In his thesis, he cataloged 25 patterns for various biochemical networks. In later work, his research group, together with Carl D Christensen and Johann Rohwer, developed a Python based tool called SymCA that was part of the PySCeSToolbox toolkit that could generate patterns automatically and symbolically from a description of the network. This software was used to generate the patterns shown below.

The control equations, especially the numerators of the equations, can give information on the relative importance and routes by which perturbations travel through a biochemical network

== Notation ==
Control patterns describe how a perturbation to a given parameter affects the steady-state level of a given variable. For example, a concentration control coefficient can describe how the overexpression of a specific enzyme can influence steady-state metabolite concentrations. Flux control coefficients are similar in that they describe how a perturbation in a given enzyme affects steady-state flux through a pathway. Such coefficients can be written in terms of elasticity coefficients.

Elasticity coefficients are local properties that describe how a single reaction is influenced by changes in the substrates and products that might influence the rate. For example, given a reaction such as:

$S \stackrel{v}{\longrightarrow} P$

we will assume it has a rate of reaction of $v$. This reaction rate can be influenced by changes in the concentrations of substrate $S$ or product $P$. This influence is measured by an elasticity which is defined as:

$\varepsilon^{v}_s = \frac{\partial v}{\partial s} \frac{s}{v}$

To make the notation manageable, a specific numbering scheme is used in the following patterns. If a substrate has an index of $i$, then the reaction index will be $v_{i+1}$. The product elasticity will also have an index of $i+1$. This means that a product elasticity will have identical subscripts and superscripts making them easy to identify. The source boundary species is always labeled zero as well as the label for the first reaction.

For example, the following fragment of a network illustrates this labeling:

$X_o \stackrel{v_1}{\longrightarrow} S_1 \stackrel{v_2}{\longrightarrow} S_2 \stackrel{v_3}{\longrightarrow}$

then

$\varepsilon^2_1 = \frac{\partial v_2}{\partial s_1} \frac{s_1}{v_2}, \quad \varepsilon^2_2 = \frac{\partial v_2}{\partial s_2} \frac{s_2}{v_2}, \quad \varepsilon^3_2 = \frac{\partial v_3}{\partial s_2} \frac{s_2}{v_3}$

== Linear Chains ==
=== Two-Step Pathway ===
$$X_o \stackrel{v_1}{\longrightarrow} S_1 \stackrel{v_2}{\longrightarrow} X_1$$

==== Assuming both steps are Irreversible ====
$$C^J_{e_1} = 1  \qquad  C^J_{e_2} = 0$$

$$C^{s_1}_{e_1} = \frac{1}{\varepsilon^{2}_1}\qquad  C^{s_1}_{e_2} = \frac{-1}{\varepsilon^{2}_1}$$

==== Assuming both steps are Reversible ====
$$C^J_{v_1} = \frac{\varepsilon^{2}_1}{\varepsilon^{2}_1 - \varepsilon^{1}_1}\qquad   C^J_{v_2} = \frac{-\varepsilon^{1}_1}{\varepsilon^{2}_1 - \varepsilon^{1}_1}$$

$$C^{s_1}_{v_1} = \frac{1}{\varepsilon^{2}_1 - \varepsilon^{1}_1}\qquad  C^{s_1}_{v_2} = \frac{-1}{\varepsilon^{2}_1 - \varepsilon^{1}_1}$$

=== Three-Step Pathway ===
$$X_o \stackrel{v_1}{\longrightarrow}S_1 \stackrel{v_2}{\longrightarrow} S_2 \stackrel{v_3}{\longrightarrow} X_1$$

==== Assuming the three steps are Irreversible ====
Denominator:

$d = \varepsilon^{2}_1 \varepsilon^{3}_2$

Assume that each of the following expressions is divided by d

$\begin{array}{lll} C^J_{e_1} = 1 & C^J_{e_2} = 0 & C^J_{e_3} = 0 \end{array}$

$\begin{array}{ll} C^{s_1}_{e_1} = \varepsilon^{3}_2 & C^{s_2}_{e_1} = \varepsilon^{2}_1 \\[6pt] C^{s_1}_{e_2} = -\varepsilon^{3}_2 & C^{s_2}_{e_2} = 0 \\[6pt] C^{s_2}_{e_2} = 0 & C^{s_2}_{e_3} = - \varepsilon^{2}_1 \end{array}$

==== Assuming the three steps are Reversible ====
Denominator:

$d = \varepsilon^{2}_1 \varepsilon^{3}_2 -\varepsilon^{1}_1 \varepsilon^{3}_2 + \varepsilon^{1}_1 \varepsilon^{2}_2$

Assume that each of the following expressions is divided by $d$

$\begin{array}{lll} C^J_{e_1} = \varepsilon^{2}_1 \varepsilon^{3}_2 & C^J_{e_2} = -\varepsilon^{1}_1 \varepsilon^{3}_2 & C^J_{e_3} = \varepsilon^{1}_1 \varepsilon^{2}_2 \\[6pt] \end{array}$

$\begin{array}{ll} C^{s_1}_{e_1} = \varepsilon^{3}_2 - \varepsilon^{2}_2 & C^{s_2}_{e_1} = \varepsilon^{2}_1 \\[6pt] C^{s_1}_{e_2} = -\varepsilon^{3}_2 & C^{s_2}_{e_2} = -\varepsilon^{1}_1 \\[6pt] C^{s_1}_{e_3} = \varepsilon^{2}_2 & C^{s_2}_{e_3} = \varepsilon^{1}_1 - \varepsilon^{2}_1 \end{array}$

=== Four-Step Pathway ===
$$X_o \stackrel{v_1}{\longrightarrow}S_1 \stackrel{v_2}{\longrightarrow} S_2 \stackrel{v_3}{\longrightarrow} S_3 \stackrel{v_4}{\longrightarrow} X_1$$

Denominator:

$d = \varepsilon^2_1 \varepsilon^3_2 \varepsilon^4_3 - \varepsilon^1_1 \varepsilon^3_2 \varepsilon^4_3 + \varepsilon^1_1 \varepsilon^2_2 \varepsilon^4_3 -\varepsilon^1_1 \varepsilon^2_2 \varepsilon^3_3$

Assume that each of the following expressions is divided by $d$.

$\begin{array}{lll} C^J_{e_1} = \varepsilon^2_1 \varepsilon^3_2 \varepsilon^4_3 & C^J_{e_2} = -\varepsilon^1_1 \varepsilon^3_2 \varepsilon^4_3 & C^J_{e_3} = \varepsilon^1_1 \varepsilon^2_2 \varepsilon^4_3 & C^J_{e_4} = -\varepsilon^1_1 \varepsilon^2_2 \varepsilon^3_3 \\[4pt] C^{s_1}_{e_1} = \varepsilon^2_2 \varepsilon^3_3 - \varepsilon^2_2 \varepsilon^4_3 + \varepsilon^3_2 \varepsilon^4_3 & C^{s_1}_{e_2} = \varepsilon^3_2 \varepsilon^4_3 & C^{s_1}_{e_3} = \varepsilon^2_2 \varepsilon^4_3 & C^{s_1}_{e_4} = -\varepsilon^2_2 \varepsilon^3_3 \\[4pt] C^{s_2}_{e_1} = \varepsilon^2_1 \varepsilon^4_3 - \varepsilon^2_1 \varepsilon^3_3 & C^{s_2}_{e_2} = \varepsilon^1_1 \varepsilon^3_3 - \varepsilon^1_1 \varepsilon^4_3 & C^{s_2}_{e_3} = \varepsilon^1_1 \varepsilon^4_3 - \varepsilon^2_1 \varepsilon^4_3 & C^{s_2}_{e_4} = \varepsilon^2_1 \varepsilon^3_3 - \varepsilon^1_1 \varepsilon^3_3 \\[4pt] C^{s_3}_{e_1} = \varepsilon^2_1 \varepsilon^3_2 & C^{s_3}_{e_2} = -\varepsilon^1_1 \varepsilon^3_2 & C^{s_3}_{e_3} = \varepsilon^1_1 \varepsilon^2_2 & C^{s_3}_{e_4} = -\varepsilon^1_1 \varepsilon^2_2 + \varepsilon^1_1 \varepsilon^3_2 - \varepsilon^2_1 \varepsilon^3_2 \end{array}$

=== Five-Step Pathway ===
$$X_o \stackrel{v_1}{\longrightarrow}S_1 \stackrel{v_2}{\longrightarrow} S_2 \stackrel{v_3}{\longrightarrow} S_3 \stackrel{v_4}{\longrightarrow} S_4 \stackrel{v_5}{\longrightarrow} X_1$$

Denominator:

$d = \varepsilon_1^2 \varepsilon_2^3 \varepsilon_3^4 \varepsilon_4^5-\varepsilon_1^1 \varepsilon_2^3 \varepsilon_3^4 \varepsilon_4^5+\varepsilon_1^1 \varepsilon_2^2 \varepsilon_3^4 \varepsilon_4^5-\varepsilon_1^1 \varepsilon_2^2 \varepsilon_3^3 \varepsilon_4^5+\varepsilon_1^1 \varepsilon_2^2 \varepsilon_3^3 \varepsilon_4^4$

Assume that each of the following expressions is divided by $d$

$\begin{array}{llll} C^J_{e_1} = \varepsilon_1^2 \varepsilon_2^3 \varepsilon_3^4 \varepsilon_4^5 & C^J_{e_2} = -\varepsilon_1^1 \varepsilon_2^3 \varepsilon_3^4 \varepsilon_4^5 & C^J_{e_3} = \varepsilon_1^1 \varepsilon_2^2 \varepsilon_3^4 \varepsilon_4^5 & C^J_{e_4} = -\varepsilon_1^1 \varepsilon_2^2 \varepsilon_3^3 \varepsilon_4^5 & C^J_{e_5} = \varepsilon_1^1 \varepsilon_2^2 \varepsilon_3^3 \varepsilon_4^4 \\[4pt] C^{s_1}_{e_1} = \varepsilon_2^3 \varepsilon_3^4 \varepsilon_4^5-\varepsilon_2^2 \varepsilon_3^4 \varepsilon_4^5+\varepsilon_2^2 \varepsilon_3^3 \varepsilon_4^5-\varepsilon_2^2 \varepsilon_3^3 \varepsilon_4^4 & C^{s_1}_{e_2} = -\varepsilon_2^3 \varepsilon_3^4 \varepsilon_4^5 & C^{s_1}_{e_3} = \varepsilon_2^2 \varepsilon_3^4 \varepsilon_4^5 & C^{s_1}_{e_4} = -\varepsilon_2^2 \varepsilon_3^3 \varepsilon_4^5 & C^{s_1}_{e_5} = \varepsilon_2^2 \varepsilon_3^3 \varepsilon_4^4 \\[4pt] C^{s_2}_{e_1} = \varepsilon_1^2 \varepsilon_3^4 \varepsilon_4^5-\varepsilon_1^2 \varepsilon_3^3 \varepsilon_4^5+\varepsilon_1^2 \varepsilon_3^3 \varepsilon_4^4 & C^{s_2}_{e_2} = -\varepsilon_1^1 \varepsilon_3^4 \varepsilon_4^5+\varepsilon_1^1 \varepsilon_3^3 \varepsilon_4^5-\varepsilon_1^1 \varepsilon_3^3 \varepsilon_4^4 & C^{s_2}_{e_3} = -\varepsilon_1^2 \varepsilon_3^4 \varepsilon_4^5+\varepsilon_1^1 \varepsilon_3^4 \varepsilon_4^5 & C^{s_2}_{e_4} = \varepsilon_1^2 \varepsilon_3^3 \varepsilon_4^5-\varepsilon_1^1 \varepsilon_3^3 \varepsilon_4^5 & C^{s_2}_{e_5} = -\varepsilon_1^2 \varepsilon_3^3 \varepsilon_4^4+\varepsilon_1^1 \varepsilon_3^3 \varepsilon_4^4 \\[4pt] C^{s_3}_{e_1} = \varepsilon_1^2 \varepsilon_2^3 \varepsilon_4^5-\varepsilon_1^2 \varepsilon_2^3 \varepsilon_4^4 & C^{s_3}_{e_2} = -\varepsilon_1^1 \varepsilon_2^3 \varepsilon_4^5+\varepsilon_1^1 \varepsilon_2^3 \varepsilon_4^4 & C^{s_3}_{e_3} = \varepsilon_1^1 \varepsilon_2^2 \varepsilon_4^5-\varepsilon_1^1 \varepsilon_2^2 \varepsilon_4^4 & C^{s_3}_{e_4} = -\varepsilon_1^2 \varepsilon_2^3 \varepsilon_4^5+\varepsilon_1^1 \varepsilon_2^3 \varepsilon_4^5-\varepsilon_1^1 \varepsilon_2^2 \varepsilon_4^5 & C^{s_3}_{e_5} = \varepsilon_1^2 \varepsilon_2^3 \varepsilon_4^4-\varepsilon_1^1 \varepsilon_2^3 \varepsilon_4^4+\varepsilon_1^1 \varepsilon_2^2 \varepsilon_4^4 \\[4pt] C^{s_4}_{e_1} = \varepsilon_1^2 \varepsilon_2^3 \varepsilon_3^4 & C^{s_4}_{e_2} = -\varepsilon_1^1 \varepsilon_2^3 \varepsilon_3^4 & C^{s_4}_{e_3} = \varepsilon_1^1 \varepsilon_2^2 \varepsilon_3^4 & C^{s_4}_{e_4} = -\varepsilon_1^1 \varepsilon_2^2 \varepsilon_3^3 & C^{s_4}_{e_5} = -\varepsilon_1^2 \varepsilon_2^3 \varepsilon_3^4+\varepsilon_1^1 \varepsilon_2^3 \varepsilon_3^4-\varepsilon_1^1 \varepsilon_2^2 \varepsilon_3^4+\varepsilon_1^1 \varepsilon_2^2 \varepsilon_3^3 \\[4pt] \end{array}$

== Linear Chains with Negative Feedback ==
=== Three-Step Pathway ===
Denominator:

$d = \varepsilon^1_1 \varepsilon^2_2 - \varepsilon^1_1 \varepsilon^3_2 + \varepsilon^2_1 \varepsilon^3_2 -\varepsilon^1_2 \varepsilon^2_1$

Assume that each of the following expressions is divided by $d$.

$\begin{array}{lll} C^{J}_{e_1} = \varepsilon^2_1 \varepsilon^3_2 & C^{J}_{e_2} = -\varepsilon^1_1 \varepsilon^3_2 & C^{J}_{e_3} = \varepsilon^1_1 \varepsilon^2_2 - \varepsilon^1_2 \varepsilon^2_1 \\[4pt] C^{s_1}_{e_1} = \varepsilon^3_2 - \varepsilon^2_2 & C^{s_1}_{e_2} = -\varepsilon^3_2 - \varepsilon^1_2 & C^{s_1}_{e_3} = \varepsilon^2_2 - \varepsilon^1_2 \\[4pt] C^{s_2}_{e_1} = \varepsilon^2_1 & C^{s_2}_{e_2} = -\varepsilon^1_1 & C^{s_2}_{e_3} = \varepsilon^1_1 - \varepsilon^2_1 \\[4pt] \end{array}$

=== Four-Step Pathway ===
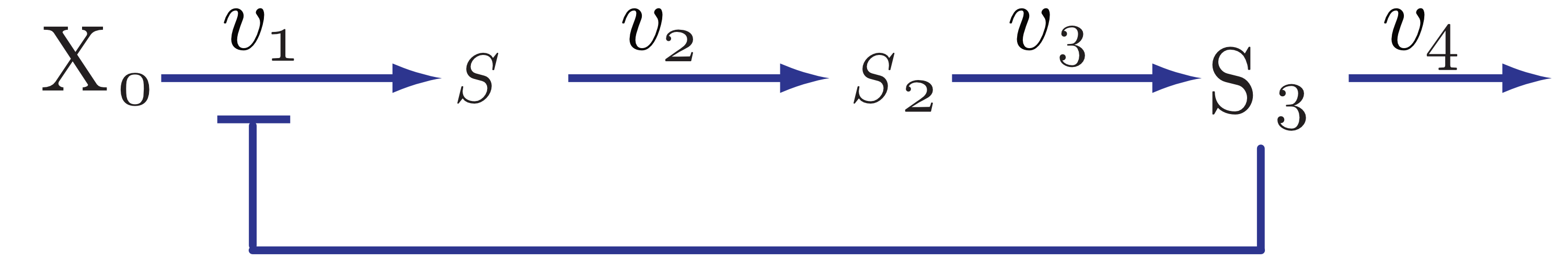

Denominator:

$d = \varepsilon^{1}_{1} \varepsilon^{2}_{2} \varepsilon^{4}_{3} - \varepsilon^{1}_{1} \varepsilon^{3}_{2} \varepsilon^{4}_{3} - \varepsilon^{1}_{3} \varepsilon^{2}_{1} \varepsilon^{3}_{2} + \varepsilon^{2}_{1} \varepsilon^{3}_{2} \varepsilon^{4}_{3} - \varepsilon^{1}_{1} \varepsilon^{2}_{2} \varepsilon^{3}_{3}$

Assume that each of the following expressions is divided by $d$.

$\begin{array}{llll} C^J_{v_1} = \varepsilon^{2}_{1} \varepsilon^{3}_{2} \varepsilon^{4}_{3} & C^J_{v_2} = -\varepsilon^{1}_{1} \varepsilon^{3}_{2} \varepsilon^{4}_{3} & C^J_{v_3} = \varepsilon^{1}_{1} \varepsilon^{2}_{2} \varepsilon^{4}_{3} & C^J_{v_4} = - \varepsilon^{1}_{1} \varepsilon^{2}_{2} \varepsilon^{3}_{3} - \varepsilon^{1}_{3} \varepsilon^{2}_{1} \varepsilon^{3}_{2} \\ C^{S_1}_{v_1} = \varepsilon^{2}_{2} \varepsilon^{3}_{3} - \varepsilon^{2}_{2} \varepsilon^{4}_{3} + \varepsilon^{3}_{2} \varepsilon^{4}_{3} & C^{S_1}_{v_2} = \varepsilon^{1}_{3} \varepsilon^{3}_{2} - \varepsilon^{3}_{2} \varepsilon^{4}_{3} & C^{S_1}_{v_3} = - \varepsilon^{1}_{3} \varepsilon^{2}_{2} + \varepsilon^{2}_{2} \varepsilon^{4}_{3} & C^{S_1}_{v_4} = \varepsilon^{1}_{3} \varepsilon^{2}_{2} - \varepsilon^{1}_{3} \varepsilon^{3}_{2} - \varepsilon^{2}_{2} \varepsilon^{3}_{3} \\ C^{S_2}_{v_1} = - \varepsilon^{2}_{1} \varepsilon^{3}_{3} + \varepsilon^{2}_{1} \varepsilon^{4}_{3} & C^{S_2}_{v_2} = \varepsilon^{1}_{1} \varepsilon^{3}_{3} - \varepsilon^{1}_{1} \varepsilon^{4}_{3} & C^{S_2}_{v_3} = \varepsilon^{1}_{B} \varepsilon^{4}_{3} + \varepsilon^{1}_{3} \varepsilon^{2}_{1} - \varepsilon^{2}_{1} \varepsilon^{4}_{3} & C^{S_2}_{v_4} = - \varepsilon^{1}_{1} \varepsilon^{3}_{3} - \varepsilon^{1}_{3} \varepsilon^{2}_{1} + \varepsilon^{2}_{1} \varepsilon^{3}_{3} \\ C^{S_3}_{v_1} = \varepsilon^{2}_{1} \varepsilon^{3}_{2} & C^{S_3}_{v_2} = - \varepsilon^{1}_{1} \varepsilon^{3}_{2} & C^{S_3}_{v_3} = \varepsilon^{1}_{1} \varepsilon^{2}_{2} & C^{S_3}_{v_4} = - \varepsilon^{1}_{1} \varepsilon^{2}_{2} + \varepsilon^{1}_{1} \varepsilon^{3}_{2} - \varepsilon^{2}_{1} \varepsilon^{3}_{2} \end{array}$

== Branched Pathways ==
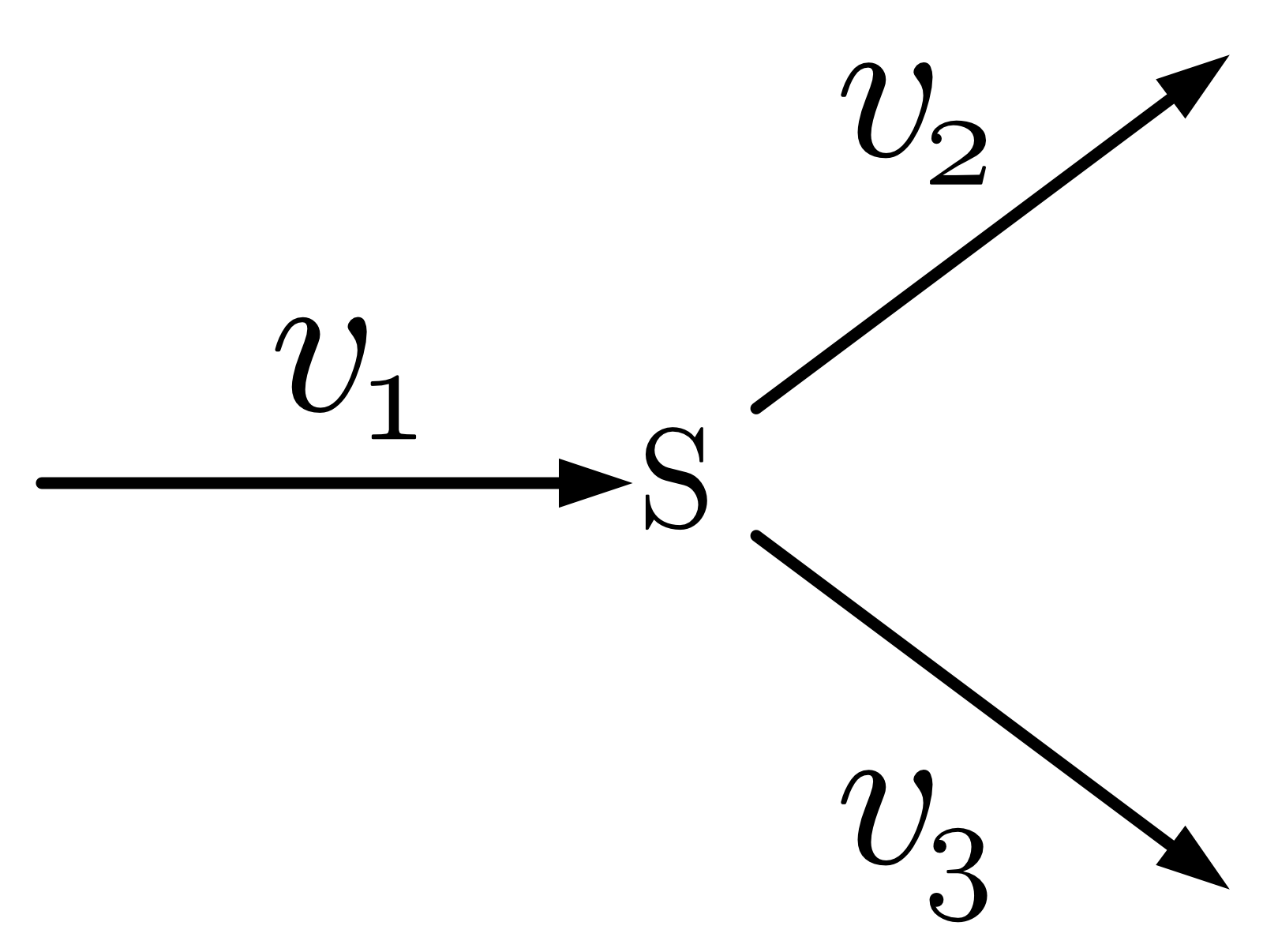

At steady-state $v_1 = v_2 + v_3$, therefore define the following two terms:

$\alpha = \frac{v_2}{v_1} \quad 1-\alpha = \frac{v_3}{v_1}$

Denominator:

$d = \varepsilon^2_s \alpha + \varepsilon^3_s (1-\alpha) -\varepsilon^1_s$

Assume that each of the following expressions is divided by $d$.

$\begin{array}{lll} C^{J_1}_{e_1} = \varepsilon^{3}_s (1-\alpha) + \varepsilon^2_s \alpha \\ C^{J_1}_{e_1} = -\varepsilon^1_s \alpha \\ C^{J_1}_{e_1} = -\varepsilon^1_s (1-\alpha) + \varepsilon^2_s \alpha \end{array}$

== See also ==
- Metabolic control analysis
- Branched pathways
- Elasticity coefficient
- Biochemical systems theory
- Control coefficient (biochemistry)
- Flux (metabolism)
