= Committed step =

Irreversible reaction step at the branch points of biochemical pathways

Schematic representation of a metabolic branch point. The numbers represent chemical compounds, whereas the letters represent enzymes that catalyze the conversion indicated by the nearby arrow. In this scheme, enzyme c catalyzes the committed step in the biosynthesis of compound 6.

In biochemistry, the committed step (also known as the first committed step) is an effectively irreversible, enzyme-catalyzed reaction that occurs at a branch point during the biosynthesis of some molecules. As the name implies, after this step, the molecules are "committed" to the pathway and will ultimately end up in the pathway's final product. The first committed step should not be confused with the rate-limiting step, which is the step with the highest flux control coefficient. It is rare that the first committed step is in fact the rate-determining step.

== Regulation ==
Metabolic pathways require tight regulation, so that the proper compounds get produced in the proper amounts at the proper time. Often, the first committed step is regulated by processes such as feedback inhibition and activation. Such regulation ensures that pathway intermediates do not accumulate, a situation that can be wasteful or even harmful to the cell.

== Examples of enzymes that catalyze the first committed steps of metabolic pathways ==
- Phosphofructokinase 1 catalyzes the first committed step of glycolysis.
- LpxC catalyzes the first committed step of lipid A biosynthesis.
- 8-amino-7-oxononanoate synthase catalyzes the first committed step in plant biotin synthesis.
- MurA catalyzes the first committed step of peptidoglycan biosynthesis.
- Aspartate transcarbamoylase catalyzes the committed step in the pyrimidine biosynthetic pathway in E. coli.
- 3-deoxy-D-arabinose-heptulsonate 7-phosphate synthase catalyses the first committed step of the shikimate pathway responsible for the synthesis of the aromatic amino acids Tyrosine, Tryptophan and Phenylalanine in plants, bacteria, fungi and some lower eukaryotes.
- Citrate synthase catalyzes the addition of acetyl-CoA to oxaloacetate and is the first committed step of the Citric Acid Cycle.
- Acetyl-CoA carboxylase catalyzes the irreversible carboxylation of acetyl-CoA to malonyl-CoA in the first committed step of fatty acid biosynthesis.
- Glucose-6-phosphate dehydrogenase catalyzes the conversion of G6P into 6-phosphogluconolactone to produce NADPH in the first and committed step of the pentose phosphate pathway.

== Other uses ==
The term has also been applied to other processes that involve a series of steps. For example, the binding of egg and sperm can be thought of as the first committed step in metazoan fertilization.

== See also ==
- Enzyme catalysis
- Negative feedback
- Metabolic Control Analysis
