= Rate-limiting step (biochemistry) =

Slowest step in a series of biochemical reactions

In biochemistry, a rate-limiting step is a reaction step that controls the rate of a series of biochemical reactions. The statement is, however, a misunderstanding of how a sequence of enzyme-catalyzed reaction steps operate. Rather than a single step controlling the rate, it has been discovered that multiple steps control the rate. Moreover, each controlling step controls the rate to varying degrees.

Blackman (1905) stated as an axiom: "when a process is conditioned as to its rapidity by a number of separate factors, the rate of the process is limited by the pace of the slowest factor." This implies that it should be possible, by studying the behavior of a complicated system such as a metabolic pathway, to characterize a single factor or reaction (namely the slowest), which plays the role of a master or rate-limiting step. In other words, the study of flux control can be simplified to the study of a single enzyme since, by definition, there can only be one 'rate-limiting' step. Since its conception, the 'rate-limiting' step has played a significant role in suggesting how metabolic pathways are controlled. Unfortunately, the notion of a 'rate-limiting' step is erroneous, at least under steady-state conditions. Modern biochemistry textbooks have begun to play down the concept. For example, the seventh edition of Lehninger Principles of Biochemistry explicitly states: "It has now become clear that, in most pathways, the control of flux is distributed among several enzymes, and the extent to which each contributes to the control varies with metabolic circumstances". However, the concept is still incorrectly used in research articles.

== Historical perspective ==
From the 1920s to the 1950s, there were a number of authors who discussed the concept of rate-limiting steps, also known as master reactions. Several authors have stated that the concept of the 'rate-limiting' step is incorrect. Burton (1936) was one of the first to point out that: "In the steady state of reaction chains, the principle of the master reaction has no application". Hearon (1952) made a more general mathematical analysis and developed strict rules for the prediction of mastery in a linear sequence of enzyme-catalysed reactions. Webb (1963) was highly critical of the concept of the rate-limiting step and of its blind application to solving problems of regulation in metabolism. Waley (1964) made a simple but illuminating analysis of simple linear chains. He showed that provided the intermediate concentrations were low compared to the $K_\mathrm{m}$ values of the enzymes, the following expression was valid:

$\frac{1}{F} = \frac{1}{Q} \left(\frac{R}{e_1} + \ldots \frac{X}{e_i} + \ldots + \frac{Z}{e_n} \right)$

where $F$ equals the pathway flux, and $Q, R, \ldots, X, \ldots$ and $Z$ are functions of the rate constants and intermediate metabolite concentrations. The $e_i$ terms are proportional to the limiting rate $V$ values of the enzymes. The first point to note from the above equation is that the pathway flux is a function of all the enzymes; there is no need for there to be a 'rate-limiting' step. If, however, all the terms $X / e_i$ from $S/e_2$ to $Z/e_n$, are small relative to $R/e_1$ then the first enzyme will contribute the most to determining the flux and therefore, could be termed the 'rate-limiting' step.

== Modern perspective ==
The modern perspective is that rate-limitingness should be quantitative and that it is distributed through a pathway to varying degrees. This idea was first considered by Higgins in the late 1950s as part of his PhD thesis where he introduced the quantitative measure he called the ‘reflection coefficient.’ This described the relative change of one variable to another for small perturbations. In his Ph.D. thesis, Higgins describes many properties of the reflection coefficients, and in later work, three groups, Savageau, Heinrich and Rapoport and Jim Burns in his thesis (1971) and subsequent publications independently and simultaneously developed this work into what is now called metabolic control analysis or, in the specific form developed by Savageau, biochemical systems theory. These developments extended Higgins’ original ideas significantly, and the formalism is now the primary theoretical approach to describing deterministic, continuous models of biochemical networks.

The variations in terminology between the different papers on metabolic control analysis were later harmonized by general agreement.

== See also ==
- Branched pathways
- Metabolic control analysis
- Biochemical systems theory
- Committed step
