= Biochemical systems equation =

The biochemical systems equation is a compact equation of nonlinear differential equations for describing a kinetic model for any network of coupled biochemical reactions and transport processes.

The equation is expressed in the following form:

$\dfrac{{\bf dx}}{dt} = {\bf N} {\bf v} ({\bf x} (p), p)$

The notation for the dependent variable x varies among authors. For example, some authors use s, indicating species. x is used here to match the state space notation used in control theory but either notation is acceptable.

$\bf N$ is the stoichiometry matrix which is an $m$ by $n$ matrix of stoichiometry coefficient. $m$ is the number of species and $n$ the number of biochemical reactions. The notation for $\bf N$ is also variable. In constraint-based modeling the symbol $\bf N$ tends to be used to indicate 'stoichiometry'. However in biochemical dynamic modeling and sensitivity analysis, $\bf N$ tends to be in more common use to indicate 'number'. In the chemistry domain, the symbol used for the stoichiometry matrix is highly variable though the symbols S and N have been used in the past.

$\bf v$ is an n-dimensional column vector of reaction rates, and $p$ is a p-dimensional column vector of parameters.

== Example ==
Given the biochemical network:

$X_o \stackrel{v_1}\longrightarrow\ x_1 \stackrel{v_2}\longrightarrow\ x_2 \stackrel{v_3}\longrightarrow\ x_3 \stackrel{v_4}\longrightarrow\ X_1$

where $X_o$ and $X_1$ are fixed species to ensure the system is open. The system equation can be written as:

$$\mathbf{N} = \begin{bmatrix}
1 &  -1 &  \phantom{+}0 & \phantom{+}0 \\
0 &   \phantom{+}1 & -1 & \phantom{+}0 \\
0 &   \phantom{+}0 &  \phantom{+}1 & -1 \\
\end{bmatrix},\$$
$$\mathbf{v} = \begin{bmatrix}
v_1  \\
v_2 \\
v_3  \\
v_4  \\
\end{bmatrix}$$

So that:

$$\begin{bmatrix}
\dfrac{dx_1}{dt}  \\[4pt]
\dfrac{dx_2}{dt}  \\[4pt]
\dfrac{dx_3}{dt}  \\[4pt]
\dfrac{dx_4}{dt}  \\[4pt]
\end{bmatrix}
= \begin{bmatrix}
1 &  -1 &  \phantom{+}0 & \phantom{+}0 \\
0 &   \phantom{+}1 & -1 & \phantom{+}0 \\
0 &   \phantom{+}0 &  \phantom{+}1 & -1 \\
\end{bmatrix}$$
$$\begin{bmatrix}
v_1  \\
v_2 \\
v_3  \\
v_4  \\
\end{bmatrix}$$

The elements of the rate vector will be rate equations that are functions of one or more species $x_i$ and parameters, p. In the example, these might be simple mass-action rate laws such as $v_2 = k_2 x_1$ where $k_2$ is the rate constant parameter. The particular laws chosen will depend on the specific system under study. Assuming mass-action kinetics, the above equation can be written in complete form as:

$$\begin{bmatrix}
\dfrac{dx_1}{dt}  \\[4pt]
\dfrac{dx_2}{dt}  \\[4pt]
\dfrac{dx_3}{dt}  \\[4pt]
\dfrac{dx_4}{dt}  \\[4pt]
\end{bmatrix}
= \begin{bmatrix}
1 &  -1 &  \phantom{+}0 & \phantom{+}0 \\
0 &   \phantom{+}1 & -1 & \phantom{+}0 \\
0 &   \phantom{+}0 &  \phantom{+}1 & -1 \\
\end{bmatrix}$$
$$\begin{bmatrix}
k_1 X_o  \\
k_2 x_1 \\
k_3 x_2  \\
k_4 x_3  \\
\end{bmatrix}$$

== Analysis ==
The system equation can be analyzed by looking at the linear response of the equation around the steady-state with respect to the parameter $\bf p$. At steady-state, the system equation is set to zero and given by:

$0 = {\bf N} {\bf v} ({\bf x} ({\bf p}), {\bf p})$

Differentiating the equation with respect to ${\bf p}$ and rearranging gives:

$\dfrac{d{\bf x}}{d{\bf p}} = -\left( {\bf N} \frac{\partial \mathbf{v}}{\partial \mathbf{x}}\right)^{-1} {\bf N} \frac{\partial \mathbf{v}}{\partial \mathbf{p}}$

This derivation assumes that the stoichiometry matrix has full rank. If this is not the case, then the inverse won't exist.

=== Example ===
For example, consider the same problem from the previous section of a linear chain. The matrix $\frac{\partial \mathbf{v}}{\partial \mathbf{x}}$ is the unscaled elasticity matrix:

$$\mathcal{E} =
\begin{bmatrix}
\dfrac{\partial v_1}{\partial x_1} & \cdots & \dfrac{\partial v_1}{\partial x_m} \\ \vdots & \ddots & \vdots \\
\dfrac{\partial v_n}{\partial x_1} & \cdots & \dfrac{\partial v_n}{\partial x_m}
\end{bmatrix}.$$

In this specific problem there are 3 species ($m=3$) and 4 reaction steps ($n = 4$), the elasticity matrix is therefore a $m \times n = 3\ \mbox{by}\ 4$ matrix. However, a number of entries in the matrix will be zero. For example $\partial v_1/\partial x_3$ will be zero since $x_3$ has no effect on $v_1$. The matrix, therefore, will contain the following entries:

$$\mathcal{E} =
\begin{bmatrix}
\dfrac{\partial v_1}{\partial x_1} & 0 & 0 \\
\dfrac{\partial v_2}{\partial x_1} & \dfrac{\partial v_2}{\partial x_2} & 0 \\
0                                  & \dfrac{\partial v_3}{\partial x_2} & \dfrac{\partial v_3}{\partial x_3}  \\
0                                  & 0 & \dfrac{\partial v_4}{\partial x_3}  \\
\end{bmatrix}.$$

The parameter matrix depends on which parameters are considered. In Metabolic control analysis, a common set of parameters are the enzyme activities. For the sake of argument, we can equate the rate constants with the enzyme activity parameters. We also assume that each enzyme, $k_i$, only can affect its own step and no other. The matrix $\frac{\partial \mathbf{v}}{\partial \mathbf{p}}$ is the unscaled elasticity matrix with respect to the parameters. Since there are 4 reaction steps and 4 corresponding parameters, the matrix will be a 4 by 4 matrix. Since each parameter only affects one reaction, the matrix will be a diagonal matrix:

$$\mathcal{E} =
\begin{bmatrix}
\dfrac{\partial v_1}{\partial k_1} & 0 & 0 & 0 \\
0                                  & \dfrac{\partial v_2}{\partial k_2} & 0 & 0 \\
0                                  & 0                                   & \dfrac{\partial v_3}{\partial k_3} & 0 \\
0                                  & 0                                   & & \dfrac{\partial v_4}{\partial k_4}  \\
\end{bmatrix}.$$

Since there are 3 species and 4 reactions, the resulting matrix $\frac{d{\bf x}}{d {\bf p}}$ will be a 3 by 4 matrix

$D = \mathcal{E}^{1}_{1} \mathcal{E}^{2}_{2} (\mathcal{E}^{3}_{3}-\mathcal{E}^{4}_{3})+\mathcal{E}^{1}_{1} \mathcal{E}^{3}_{2} \mathcal{E}^{4}_{3}-\mathcal{E}^{1}_{2} \mathcal{E}^{3}_{2} \mathcal{E}^{4}_{3}$

$\vphantom{ }$

$\frac{d{\bf x}}{d {\bf p}} = \frac{1}{D} \left[ \begin{array}{ll} \mathcal{E}^{1}_{k_1} (\mathcal{E}^{2}_{2} (\mathcal{E}^{3}_{3}-\mathcal{E}^{4}_{3})+\mathcal{E}^{3}_{2} \mathcal{E}^{4}_{3}) & -\mathcal{E}^{3}_{2} \mathcal{E}^{4}_{3} \mathcal{E}^{2}_{k_2} \\ \mathcal{E}^{1}_{2} \mathcal{E}^{1}_{k_1} (\mathcal{E}^{3}_{3}-\mathcal{E}^{4}_{3}) & \mathcal{E}^{1}_{1} \mathcal{E}^{2}_{k_2} (\mathcal{E}^{3}_{3}-\mathcal{E}^{4}_{3}) \\ \mathcal{E}^{1}_{2} \mathcal{E}^{3}_{2} \mathcal{E}^{1}_{k_1} & \mathcal{E}^{1}_{1} \mathcal{E}^{3}_{2} \mathcal{E}^{2}_{k_2} \\ \end{array} \right.$

$\qquad\qquad\qquad\quad \left. \begin{array}{ll} \mathcal{E}^{2}_{2} \mathcal{E}^{4}_{3} \mathcal{E}^{3}_{k_3} & \mathcal{E}^{2}_{2} \mathcal{E}^{3}_{3} \mathcal{E}^{4}_{k_4} \\ \mathcal{E}^{4}_{3} \mathcal{E}^{3}_{k_3} (\mathcal{E}^{1}_{1}-\mathcal{E}^{1}_{2}) & \mathcal{E}^{3}_{3} \mathcal{E}^{4}_{k_4} (\mathcal{E}^{1}_{2}-\mathcal{E}^{1}_{1}) \\ \mathcal{E}^{1}_{1} \mathcal{E}^{2}_{2} \mathcal{E}^{3}_{k_3} & -\mathcal{E}^{4}_{k_4} (\mathcal{E}^{1}_{1} (\mathcal{E}^{2}_{2}-\mathcal{E}^{3}_{2})+\mathcal{E}^{1}_{2} \mathcal{E}^{3}_{2}) \\ \end{array} \right]$

Each expression in the matrix describes how a given parameter influences the steady-state concentration of a given species. Note that this is the unscaled derivative. It is often the case that the derivative is scaled by the parameter and concentration to eliminate units as well as turn the measure into a relative change.

== Assumptions ==
The biochemical systems equation makes two key assumptions:

1. Species exist in a well-stirred reactor, so there are no spatial gradients.
2. Species concentrations are high enough so that stochastic effects are negligible

== See also ==
- Stoichiometry matrix
- Chemical reaction network theory
- List of systems biology modeling software
