= Linear biochemical pathway =

Chain of enzyme-catalyzed reactions steps

A linear biochemical pathway is a chain of enzyme-catalyzed reaction steps where the product of one reaction becomes the substrate for the next reaction. The molecules progress through the pathway sequentially from the starting substrate to the final product. Each step in the pathway is usually facilitated by a different specific enzyme that catalyzes the chemical transformation. An example includes DNA replication, which connects the starting substrate and the end product in a straightforward sequence.

Biological cells consume nutrients to sustain life. These nutrients are broken down to smaller molecules. Some of the molecules are used in the cells for various biological functions, and others are reassembled into more complex structures required for life. The breakdown and reassembly of nutrients is called metabolism. An individual cell contains thousands of different kinds of small molecules, such as sugars, lipids, and amino acids. The interconversion of these molecules is carried out by catalysts called enzymes. For example, the most widely studied bacterium, E. coli strain K-12, is able to produce about 2,338 metabolic enzymes. These enzymes collectively form a complex web of reactions comprising pathways by which substrates (including nutrients and intermediates) are converted to products (other intermediates and end-products).

The figure below shows a four step pathway, with intermediates, $S_1, S_2,$ and $S_3$. To sustain a steady-state, the boundary species $X_o$ and $X_1$ are fixed. Each step is catalyzed by an enzyme, $e_i$.

Linear pathways follow a step-by-step sequence, where each enzymatic reaction results in the transformation of a substrate into an intermediate product. This intermediate is processed by subsequent enzymes until the final product is synthesized.

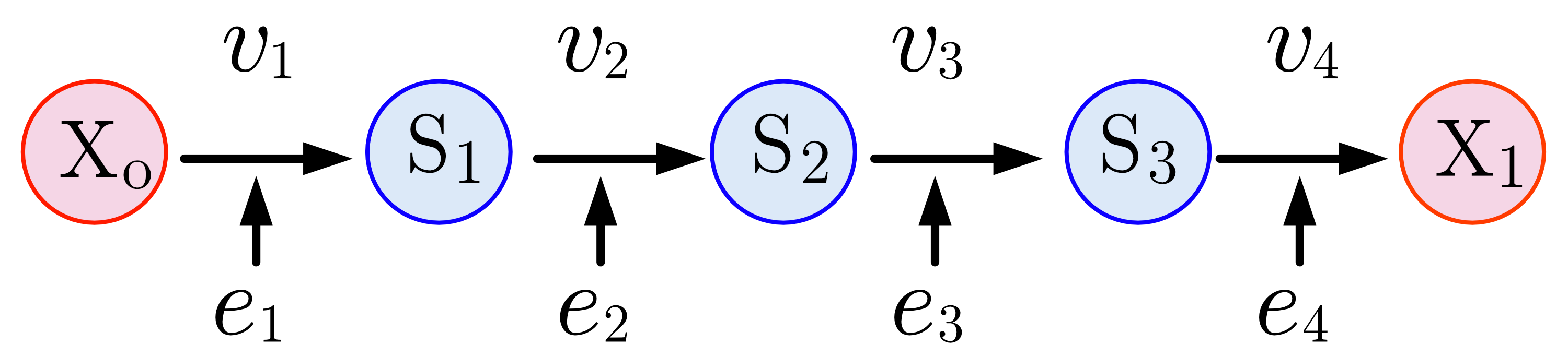
A linear chain of four enzyme-catalyzed steps.

A linear pathway can be studied in various ways. Multiple computer simulations can be run to try to understand the pathway's behavior. Another way to understand the properties of a linear pathway is to take a more analytical approach. Analytical solutions can be derived for the steady-state if simple mass-action kinetics are assumed. Analytical solutions for the steady-state when assuming Michaelis-Menten kinetics can be obtained but are quite often avoided. Instead, such models are linearized. The three approaches that are usually used are therefore:

- Computer simulation
- Analytical solutions using a linear mathematical model
- Linearization of a non-linear model

== Computer simulation ==
It is possible to build a computer simulation of a linear biochemical pathway. This can be done by building a simple model that describes each intermediate through a differential equation. The differential equations can be written by invoking mass conservation. For example, for the linear pathway:

$X_o \stackrel{v_1}{\longrightarrow} S_1 \stackrel{v_2}{\longrightarrow} S_2 \stackrel{v_3}{\longrightarrow} S_3 \stackrel{v_4}{\longrightarrow} X_1$

where $X_o$ and $X_1$ are fixed boundary species, the non-fixed intermediate $S_1$ can be described using the differential equation:

$\frac{dS_1}{dt} = v_1 - v_2$

The rate of change of the non-fixed intermediates $S_2$ and $S_3$ can be written in the same way:

$\frac{dS_2}{dt} = v_2 - v_3$

$\frac{dS_3}{dt} = v_3 - v_4$

To run a simulation the rates, $v_i$ need to be defined. If mass-action kinetics are assumed for the reaction rates, then the differential equation can be written as:

$\begin{array}{lcl} \dfrac{dS_1}{dt} &=& k_1 X_o - k_2 S_1 \\[4pt] \dfrac{dS_2}{dt} &=& k_2 S_1 - k_3 S_2 \\[4pt] \dfrac{dS_3}{dt} &=& k_3 S_2 - k_4 S_3 \end{array}$

If values are assigned to the rate constants, $k_i$, and the fixed species $X_o$ and $X_1$the differential equations can be solved.

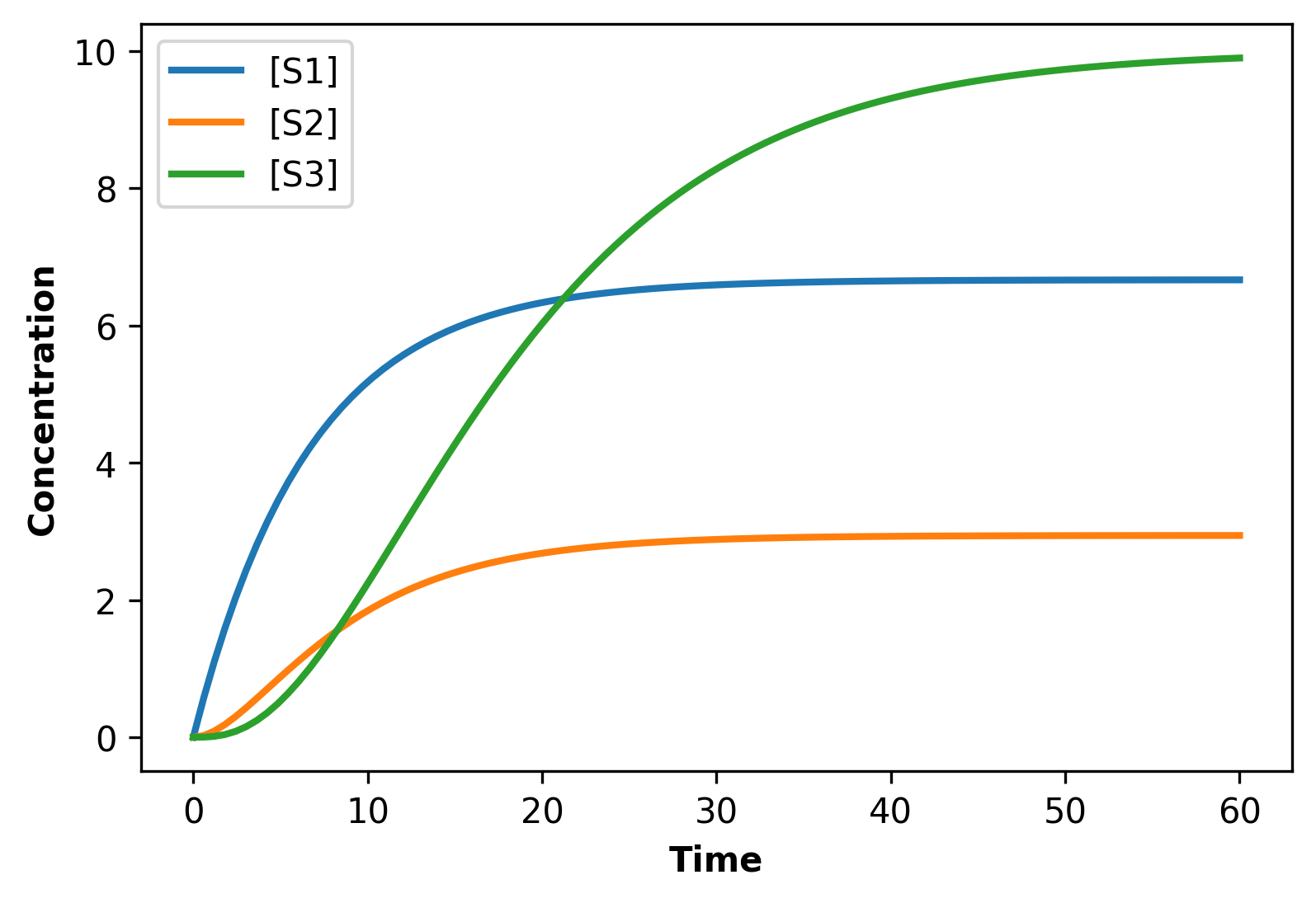
This plot shows a simulation of three intermediates from a four step pathway. The boundary species are fixed, enabling the pathway to reach a steady state. Values k1 = 0.1; k2 = 0.15; k3 = 0.34; k4 = 0.1, Xo = 10, X1 = 0. S1, S2 and S3 are zero at time zero.

== Analytical solutions ==
Computer simulations can only yield so much insight, as one would be required to run simulations on a wide range of parameter values, which can be unwieldy. A generally more powerful way to understand the properties of a model is to solve the differential equations analytically.

Analytical solutions are possible if simple mass-action kinetics on each reaction step are assumed:

$$v_i = k_i s_{i-1} - k_{-i} s_{i}$$

where $k_i$ and $k_{-1}$ are the forward and reverse rate-constants, respectively. $s_{i-1}$ is the substrate and $s_i$ the product. If the equilibrium constant for this reaction is:

$$K_{eq} = q_i = \frac{k_i}{k_{-i}} = \frac{s_i}{s_{i-1}}$$

The mass-action kinetic equation can be modified to be:

$$v_i = k_i \left( s_{i-1} - \frac{s_i}{q_i} \right)$$

Given the reaction rates, the differential equations describing the rates of change of the species can be described. For example, the rate of change of $s_1$ will equal:

$$\frac{ds_1}{dt} = k_1 \left( x_0 - \frac{s_1}{q_1} \right) - k_2 \left( s_1 - \frac{s_2}{q_2} \right)$$

By setting the differential equations to zero, the steady-state concentration for the species can be derived. From here, the pathway flux equation can be determined. For the three-step pathway, the steady-state concentrations of $s_1$ and $s_2$ are given by:

$$\begin{aligned}
&s_1=\frac{q_1}{q_3} \frac{k_2 k_3 x_1+k_1 k_2 q_3 x_o+k_1 k_3 q_2 q_3 x_o}{k_1 k_2+k_1 k_3 q_2+k_2 k_3 q_1 q_2} \\[6pt]
&s_2=\frac{q_2}{q_3} \frac{k_1 k_3 x_1+k_2 k_3 q_1 x_1+k_1 k_2 q_1 q_3 x_o}{k_1 k_2+k_1 k_3 q_2+k_2 k_3 q_1 q_2}
\end{aligned}$$

Inserting either $s_1$ or $s_2$ into one of the rate laws will give the steady-state pathway flux, $J$:

$$J=\frac{x_o q_1 q_2 q_3-x_1}{\frac{1}{k_1} q_1 q_2 q_3+\frac{1}{k_2} q_2 q_3+\frac{1}{k_3} q_3}$$

A pattern can be seen in this equation such that, in general, for a linear pathway of $n$ steps, the steady-state pathway flux is given by:

$J=\frac{x_o \prod_{i=1}^n q_i-x_1}{\sum_{i=1}^n \frac{1}{k_i}\left(\prod_{j=i}^n q_j\right)}$

Note that the pathway flux is a function of all the kinetic and thermodynamic parameters. This means there is no single parameter that determines the flux completely. If $k_i$ is equated to enzyme activity, then every enzyme in the pathway has some influence over the flux.

== Linearized model: deriving control coefficients ==
Given the flux expression, it is possible to derive the flux control coefficients by differentiation and scaling of the flux expression. This can be done for the general case of $n$ steps:

$C_i^J=\frac{\frac{1}{k_i} \prod_{j=i}^n q_j}{\sum_{j=1}^n \frac{1}{k_j} \prod_{k=j}^n q_k}$

This result yields two corollaries:

- The sum of the flux control coefficients is one. This confirms the summation theorem.
- The value of an individual flux control coefficient in a linear reaction chain is greater than 0 or less than one: $0 \leq C^J_i \leq 1$

For the three-step linear chain, the flux control coefficients are given by:

$C_1^J=\frac{1}{k_1} \frac{q_1 q_2 q_3}{d} ; \quad C_2^J=\frac{1}{k_2} \frac{q_2 q_3}{d} ; \quad C_3^J=\frac{1}{k_3} \frac{q_3}{d}$

where $d$ is given by:

$d=\frac{1}{k_1} q_1 q_2 q_3+\frac{1}{k_2} q_2 q_3+\frac{1}{k_3} q_3$

Given these results, there are some patterns:

- If all three steps have large equilibrium constants, that is $q_i \gg 1$, then $C^J_{1}$ tends to one and the remaining coefficients tend to zero.
- If the equilibrium constants are smaller, control tends to get distributed across all three steps.

With more moderate equilibrium constants, perturbations can travel upstream as well as downstream. For example, a perturbation at the last step, $k_3$, is better able to influence the reaction rates upstream, which results in an alteration in the steady-state flux.

An important result can be obtained if all $k_i$ are set as equal to each other. Under these conditions, the flux control coefficient is proportional to the numerator. That is:

$$\begin{aligned}
C^J_1 &\propto q_1 q_2 q_ 3\\
C^J_2 &\propto q_2 q_ 3\\
C^J_3 &\propto q_ 3\\
\end{aligned}$$

If it is assumed that the equilibrium constants are all greater than 1.0, as earlier steps have more $q_i$ terms, it must mean that earlier steps will, in general, have high larger flux control coefficients. In a linear chain of reaction steps, flux control will tend to be biased towards the front of the pathway. From a metabolic engineering or drug-targeting perspective, preference should be given to targeting the earlier steps in a pathway since they have the greatest effect on pathway flux. Note that this rule only applies to pathways without negative feedback loops.
