= Flux (metabolism) =

Rate of turnover of molecules in a metabolic pathway

In biochemistry, metabolic flux (often referred to as flux) is the rate of turnover of molecules through a metabolic pathway. Flux is regulated by the enzymes involved in a pathway. Within cells, regulation of flux is vital for all metabolic pathways to regulate the pathway's activity under different conditions. Flux is therefore of great interest in metabolic network modelling, where it is analysed via flux balance analysis and metabolic control analysis.

In this manner, flux is the movement of matter through metabolic networks that are connected by metabolites and cofactors, and is therefore a way of describing the activity of the metabolic network as a whole using a single characteristic.

== Metabolic flux ==
It is easiest to describe the flux of metabolites through a pathway by considering the reaction steps individually. The flux of the metabolites through each reaction (J) is the rate of the forward reaction (V_{f}), less that of the reverse reaction (V_{r}):

$$J = V_f - V_r$$

At equilibrium, there is no flux. Furthermore, it is observed that throughout a steady-state pathway, the flux is determined to varying degrees by all steps in the pathway. The degree of influence is measured by the flux control coefficient.

=== Control of metabolic flux ===
Control of flux through a metabolic pathway requires that

- The degree to which metabolic steps determine the metabolic flux varies based on the organisms' metabolic needs.
- The change in flux that occurs due to the above requirement being communicated to the rest of the metabolic pathway in order to maintain a steady-state.

Control of flux in a metabolic pathways:

- The control of flux is a systemic property, that is it depends, to varying degrees, on all interactions in the system.
- The control of flux is measured by the flux control coefficient
- In a linear chain of reactions, the flux control coefficient will have values between zero and one.
- A step with a flux control coefficient of zero means that, that particular step, has no influence over the steady-state flux.
- A step in a linear chain with a flux control coefficient of one means that that particular step has complete control over the steady-state flux.
- A flux control coefficient can only be measured in the intact system and cannot for example be determined by inspection of an isolated enzyme in vitro.

== Metabolic networks ==
Cellular metabolism is represented by a large number of metabolic reactions involving the conversion of the carbon source (usually glucose) into the building blocks needed for macromolecular biosynthesis. These reactions form metabolic networks within cells. These networks can then be used to study metabolism within cells.

To allow these networks to interact, a tight connection between them is necessary. This connection is provided by usage of common cofactors such as ATP, ADP, NADH and NADPH. In addition to this, sharing of some metabolites between the different networks further tightens the connections between the different networks.

=== Control of metabolic networks ===
Existing metabolic networks control the movement of molecules through their enzymatic steps by regulating enzymes that catalyze irreversible reactions. The movement of molecules through reversible steps is generally unregulated by enzymes, but rather regulated by the concentration of products and reactants. Irreversible reactions at regulated steps of a pathway have a negative free energy change, thereby promoting spontaneous reactions in one direction only. Reversible reactions have no or very small free energy change. As a result, the movement of molecules through a metabolic network is governed by simple chemical equilibria (at reversible steps), with specific key enzymes that are subject to regulation (at irreversible steps). This enzymatic regulation may be indirect, in the case of an enzyme being regulated by some cell signalling mechanism (like phosphorylation), or it may be direct, as in the case of allosteric regulation, where metabolites from a different portion of a metabolic network bind directly to and affect the catalytic function of other enzymes in order to maintain homeostasis.

A result that may seem at first counter intuitive, is that regulated steps tends to have small flux control coefficients. The reason is that these steps are part of a control system that stabilizes fluxes, hence a perturbation in the activity of a regulated step will inevitably trigger the control system to resist the perturbation, hence the flux control coefficients will tend to be small. This explains why, for example, that phosphofructokinase in glycolysis has such as small flux control coefficient.

== Fluxes and genotype ==
Metabolic fluxes are a function of gene expression, translation, post translational protein modifications and protein-metabolite interactions.

== Fluxes and phenotype ==
The function of the central carbon metabolism (metabolism of glucose) has been fine-tuned to exactly meet the needs of the building blocks and Gibbs free energy in conjunction with cell growth. There is therefore tight regulation of the fluxes through the central carbon metabolism.

The flux in a reaction can be defined based on one of three things

- The activity of the enzyme catalysing the reaction
- The properties of the enzyme
- The metabolite concentration affecting enzyme activity.

Considering the above, the metabolic fluxes can be described as the ultimate representation of the cellular phenotype when expressed under certain conditions.

== Roles of metabolic flux in cells ==
=== Regulation of mammalian cell growth ===
Research has shown that cells undergoing rapid growth have shown changes in their metabolism. These changes are observed with regards to glucose metabolism. The changes in metabolism occur because the rate of metabolism controls various signal transduction pathways that coordinate the activation of transcription factors as well as determining cell-cycle progress.

Growing cells require synthesis of new nucleotides, membranes and protein components. These materials can be obtained from carbon metabolism (e.g. glucose metabolism) or from peripheral metabolism. The enhanced flux observed in abnormally growing cells is brought about by high glucose uptake.

==== Cancer ====
Metabolic flux and more specifically how metabolism is affected due to changes in the various pathways has grown in importance since it was observed that tumour cells exhibit enhanced glucose metabolism compared to normal cells. Through studying these changes, it is possible to better understand the mechanisms of cell growth and where possible develop treatments to counter the effects of enhanced metabolism.

== Measuring fluxes ==
There are several ways of measuring fluxes, however all of these are indirect. Due to this, these methods make one key assumption which is that all fluxes into a given intracellular metabolite pool balance all the fluxes out of the pool.

This assumption means that for a given metabolic network the balances around each metabolite impose a number of constraints on the system.

The techniques currently used mainly revolve around the use of either nuclear magnetic resonance (NMR) or gas chromatography–mass spectrometry (GC–MS).

In order to avoid the complexity of data analysis, a simpler method of estimating flux ratios has recently been developed which is based on cofeeding unlabelled and uniformly ^{13}C labelled glucose. The metabolic intermediate patterns are then analysed using NMR spectroscopy. This method can also be used to determine the metabolic network topologies.

== See also ==
- Flux balance analysis
- Metabolism
- Cell cycle
- Metabolic control analysis
- Biochemical systems equation
