= Control coefficient (biochemistry) =

Factors representing a given reaction's influence on a steady state biochemical system

In biochemistry, control coefficients are used to describe how much influence a given reaction step has on the flux or concentration of the species at steady state. This can be accomplished experimentally by changing the expression level of a given enzyme and measuring the resulting changes in flux and metabolite levels. In theory, any observables, such as growth rate, or even combinations of observables, can be defined using a control coefficient; but flux and concentration control coefficients are by far the most commonly used.

The simplest way to look at control coefficients is as the scaled derivatives of the steady-state change in an observable with respect to a change in enzyme activity (e_{i} for each species i). For example, the flux control coefficients (C^{J}_{e_{i}}, where J is the reaction rate) can be written as:

$$C_{e_i}^J = \frac{d J}{d e_i} \frac{e_i}{J} = \frac{d \ln J}{d \ln e_i} \approx \frac{J \%}{e_i \%}$$

while the concentration control coefficients (C^{s_{j}}_{e_{i}}, where s_{j} is the concentration of species j) can be written as:

$$C_{e_i}^{s_j} = \frac{d s_j}{d e_i} \frac{e_i}{s_j} = \frac{d \ln s_j}{d \ln e_i} \approx \frac{s_j \%}{e_i \%}$$

The approximation in terms of percentages makes control coefficients easier to measure and more intuitively understandable.

Control coefficients can have both negative and positive values. A negative value indicates that the observable in question decreases as a result of the change in enzyme activity.

Control coefficients are not fixed values but will change depending on the state of the pathway or organism. If an organism shifts to a new nutritional source, then the control coefficients in the pathway will change. As such, control coefficients form a central component of metabolic control analysis.

== Formal Definition ==
One criticism of the concept of the control coefficient as defined above is that it is dependent on being described relative to a change in enzyme activity. Instead, the Berlin school defined control coefficients in terms of changes to local rates brought about by any suitable parameter, which could include changes to enzyme levels or the action of drugs. Hence a more general definition is given by the following expressions:

$$C^J_{v_i} = \left( \frac{dJ}{dp} \frac{p}{J} \right) \bigg/ \left( \frac{\partial v_i}{\partial  p}\frac{p}{v_i} \right) = \frac{d\ln J}{d\ln v_i}$$

and concentration control coefficients by

$$C^s_{v_i}  = \left( \frac{ds}{dp} \frac{p}{s} \right)  \bigg/ \left( \frac{\partial v_i}{\partial p} \frac{p}{v_i} \right) = \frac{d\ln s}{d\ln v_i}$$

In the above expression, $p$ could be any convenient parameter. For example, a drug, changes in enzyme expression etc. The advantage is that the control coefficient becomes independent of the applied perturbation. For control coefficients defined in terms of changes in enzyme expression, it is often assumed that the effect on the local rate by changes to the enzyme activity is proportional so that:

$C^X_{v_i} = C^X_{e_i}$

=== Relationship to rate-limiting steps ===
In normal usage, the rate-limiting step or rate-determining step is defined as the slowest step of a chemical reaction that determines the speed (rate) at which the overall reaction proceeds. The flux control coefficients do not measure this kind of rate-limiting. For example, in a linear chain of reactions at steady-state, all steps carry the same flux. That is, there is no slow or fast step with respect to the rate or speed of a reaction. The flux control coefficient, instead, measures how much influence a given step has on the steady-state flux. A step with a high flux control coefficient means that changing the activity of the step (by changing the expression level of the enzyme) will have a large effect on the steady-state flux through the pathway and vice versa.

Historically the concept of the rate-limiting steps was also related to the notion of the master step. However, this drew much criticism due to a misunderstanding of the concept of the steady-state.

== See also ==
- Elasticity coefficient
- Metabolic control analysis
- Summation theorems (biochemistry)
