= Elasticity coefficient =

Degree to which a chemical reaction rate is influenced by a given factor

In chemistry, the rate of a chemical reaction is influenced by many different factors, such as temperature, pH, reactant, the concentration of products, and other effectors. The degree to which these factors change the reaction rate is described by the elasticity coefficient. This coefficient is defined as follows:

$$\varepsilon_{s_i}^v = \left(\frac{\partial v}{\partial s_i} \frac{s_i}{v}\right)_{s_j, \, s_k, \, \ldots} = \frac{\partial \ln v}{\partial \ln s_i} \approx \frac{v \%}{s_i \%}$$

where $v$ denotes the reaction rate and $s$ denotes the substrate concentration. Be aware that the notation will use lowercase roman letters, such as $s,$ to indicate concentrations.

The partial derivative in the definition indicates that the elasticity is measured with respect to changes in a factor S while keeping all other factors constant. The most common factors include substrates, products, enzyme, and effectors. The scaling of the coefficient ensures that it is dimensionless and independent of the units used to measure the reaction rate and magnitude of the factor. The elasticity coefficient is an integral part of metabolic control analysis and was introduced in the early 1970s and possibly earlier by Henrik Kacser and Burns in Edinburgh and Heinrich and Rapoport in Berlin.

The elasticity concept has also been described by other authors, most notably Savageau in Michigan and Clarke at Edmonton. In the late 1960s Michael Savageau developed an innovative approach called biochemical systems theory that uses power-law expansions to approximate the nonlinearities in biochemical kinetics. The theory is very similar to metabolic control analysis and has been very successfully and extensively used to study the properties of different feedback and other regulatory structures in cellular networks. The power-law expansions used in the analysis invoke coefficients called kinetic orders, which are equivalent to the elasticity coefficients.

Bruce Clarke in the early 1970s, developed a sophisticated theory on analyzing the dynamic stability in chemical networks. As part of his analysis, Clarke also introduced the notion of kinetic orders and a power-law approximation that was somewhat similar to Savageau's power-law expansions. Clarke's approach relied heavily on certain structural characteristics of networks, called extreme currents (also called elementary modes in biochemical systems). Clarke's kinetic orders are also equivalent to elasticities.

Elasticities can also be usefully interpreted as the means by which signals propagate up or down a given pathway.

The fact that different groups independently introduced the same concept implies that elasticities, or their equivalent, kinetic orders, are most likely a fundamental concept in the analysis of complex biochemical or chemical systems.

== Calculating elasticity coefficients ==
Elasticity coefficients can be calculated either algebraically or by numerical means.

=== Algebraic calculation of elasticity coefficients ===
Given the definition of the elasticity coefficient in terms of a partial derivative, it is possible, for example, to determine the elasticity of an arbitrary rate law by differentiating the rate law by the independent variable and scaling. For example, the elasticity coefficient for a mass-action rate law such as:

$$v = k\ s_1^{n_1} s_2^{n_2}$$

where $v$ is the reaction rate, $k$ the reaction rate constant, $s_i$ is the ith chemical species involved in the reaction and $n_i$ the ith reaction order, then the elasticity, $\varepsilon^v_{s_1}$ can be obtained by differentiating the rate law with respect to $s_1$ and scaling:

$$\varepsilon^v_{s_1} = \frac{\partial v}{\partial s_1} \frac{s_1}{v} = n_1\ k\ s_1^{n_1-1} s_2^{n_2} \frac{s_1}{k\ s_1^{n_1} s_2^{n_2}} = n_1$$

That is, the elasticity for a mass-action rate law is equal to the order of reaction of the species.

For example the elasticity of A in the reaction $2 A \rightleftharpoons C$ where the rate of reaction is given by: $v = k A^2$, the elasticity can be evaluated using:

$\varepsilon^v_a = \frac{\partial v}{\partial a} \frac{a}{v} = \frac{2 k a a }{k a^2} = 2$

Elasticities can also be derived for more complex rate laws such as the Michaelis–Menten rate law. If

$$v = \frac{V_\max s}{K_m + s}$$

then it can be easily shown than

$$\varepsilon^v_s = \frac{K_m}{K_m + s}$$

This equation illustrates the idea that elasticities need not be constants (as with mass-action laws) but can be a function of the reactant concentration. In this case, the elasticity approaches unity at low reactant concentration (s) and zero at high reactant concentration.

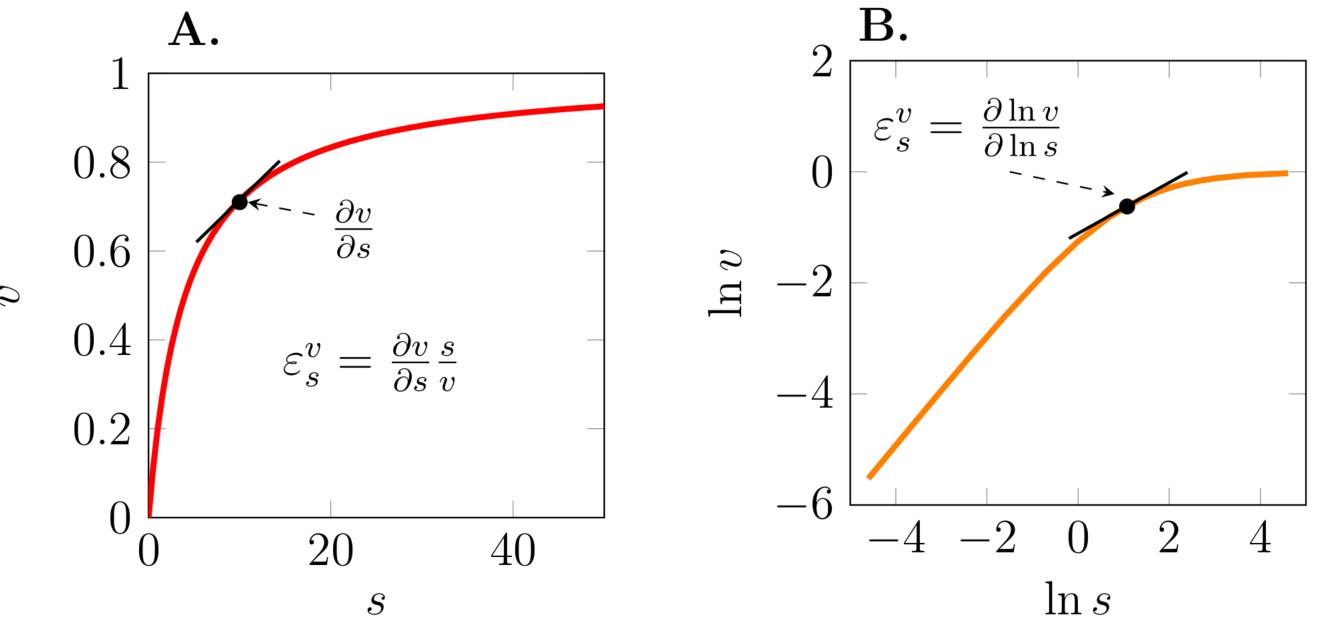
A. The slope of the reaction rate versus the reactant concentration scaled by both the reactant concentration and reaction rate yields the elasticity. If the log of the reaction rate and the log of the reactant concentration is plotted, the elasticity can be read directly from the slope of the curve. Curves were generated by assuming v = s/(2 + s)

For the reversible Michaelis–Menten rate law:

$$v = \frac{V_\max / K_{m_1} (s - p/K_\text{eq} ) }{1 + s/K_{m_1} + p/K_{m_2} }$$

where $V_\max$ is the forward $V_{max}$, $K_{m_1}$ the forward $K_m$, $K_{eq}$ the equilibrium constant and $K_{m_2}$ the reverse $K_m$, two elasticity coefficients can be calculated, one with respect to substrate, S, and another with respect to product, P. Thus:

$$\varepsilon^v_s = \frac{1}{1 - \Gamma/K_\text{eq}} - \frac{s/K_{m_1}}{1 + s/K_{m_1} + p/K_{m_2}}$$

$$\varepsilon^v_p = \frac{-\Gamma/K_\text{eq}}{1 - \Gamma/K_\text{eq}} - \frac{p/K_{m_2}}{1 + s/K_{m_1} + p/K_{m_2}}$$

where $\Gamma$ is the mass-action ratio, that is $\Gamma = p/s$. Note that when p = 0, the equations reduce to the case for the irreversible Michaelis–Menten law.

As a final example, consider the Hill equation:

$$v = \frac{V_{\max} (s/K_s)^n}{1 + (s/K_s)^n}$$

where n is the Hill coefficient and $K_s$ is the half-saturation coefficient (cf. Michaelis–Menten rate law), then the elasticity coefficient is given by:

$$\varepsilon^v_{s} = \frac{n}{1 + (s/K_s)^n}$$

Note that at low concentrations of S the elasticity approaches n. At high concentrations of S the elasticity approaches zero. This means the elasticity is bounded between zero and the Hill coefficient.

=== Summation property of elasticity coefficients ===
The elasticities for a reversible uni-uni enzyme catalyzed reaction was previously given by:

$$\varepsilon^v_s = \frac{1}{1 - \Gamma/K_\text{eq}} - \frac{s/K_{m_1}}{1 + s/K_{m_1} + p/K_{m_2}}$$

$$\varepsilon^v_p = \frac{-\Gamma/K_\text{eq}}{1 - \Gamma/K_\text{eq}} - \frac{p/K_{m_2}}{1 + s/K_{m_1} + p/K_{m_2}}$$

An interesting result can be obtained by evaluating the sum $\varepsilon^v_s + \varepsilon^v_p$. This can be shown to equal:

$\varepsilon^v_s + \varepsilon^v_p = \frac{1}{1 + s/K_{m_1} + p/K_{m_2}}$

Two extremes can be considered. At high saturation ($s > K_{m_1}, p > K_{m_2}$), the right-hand term tends to zero so that:

$\varepsilon^v_s \approx -\varepsilon^v_p$

That is the absolute magnitudes of the substrate and product elasticities tends to equal each other. However, it is unlikely that a given enzyme will have both substrate and product concentrations much greater than their respective Kms. A more plausible scenario is when the enzyme is working under sub-saturating conditions ($s < K_{m_1}, p < K_{m_2}$). Under these conditions we obtain the simpler result:

$\varepsilon^v_s + \varepsilon^v_p \approx 1$

Expressed in a different way we can state:

$||\varepsilon^v_s|| > ||\varepsilon^v_p||$

That is, the absolute value for the substrate elasticity will be greater than the absolute value for the product elasticity. This means that a substrate will have a great influence over the forward reaction rate than the corresponding product.

This result has important implications for the distribution of flux control in a pathway with sub-saturated reaction steps. In general, a perturbation near the start of a pathway will have more influence over the steady state flux than steps downstream. This is because a perturbation that travels downstream is determined by all the substrate elasticities, whereas a perturbation downstream that has to travel upstream if determined by the product elasticities. Since we have seen that the substrate elasticities tends to be larger than the product elasticities, it means that perturbations traveling downstream will be less attenuated than perturbations traveling upstream. The net effect is that flux control tends to be more concentrated at upstream steps compared to downstream steps.

The table below summarizes the extreme values for the elasticities given a reversible Michaelis-Menten rate law. Following Westerhoff et al. the table is split into four cases that include one 'reversible' type, and three 'irreversible' types.

Approximate values of elasticities under various conditions
Equilibrium State	Saturation Levels	Elasticities
Near Equilibrium	All degrees of saturation	$\varepsilon^v_s \gg 1, \varepsilon^v_p \ll -1$
Out of Equilibrium	High Substrate, high product	$\varepsilon^v_s \approx -\varepsilon^v_p$
Out of Equilibrium	High Substrate, low product	$\varepsilon^v_s \approx 0, \varepsilon^v_p \approx 0$
Out of Equilibrium	Low Substrate, high product	$\varepsilon^v_s \approx 1, \varepsilon^v_p \approx -1$
Out of Equilibrium	Low Substrate, low product	$\varepsilon^v_s \approx 1, \varepsilon^v_p \approx 0$

=== Elasticity with respect to enzyme concentration ===
The elasticity for an enzyme catalyzed reaction with respect to the enzyme concentration has special significance. The Michaelis model of enzyme action means that the reaction rate for an enzyme catalyzed reaction is a linear function of enzyme concentration. For example, the irreversible Michaelis rate law is given below there the maximal velocity, $V_m$ is explicitly given by the product of the $k_{cat}$ and total enzyme concentration, $E_t$:

$v = \frac{k_{cat} E_t s}{K_m + s}$

In general we can expression this relationship as the product of the enzyme concentration and a saturation function, $f(s)$:

$v = E_t f (s)$

This form is applicable to many enzyme mechanisms. The elasticity coefficient can be derived as follows:

$\varepsilon^v_{E_t} = \frac{\partial v}{\partial E_t} \frac{E_t}{v} = f(s) \frac{E_t}{E_t f(s)} = 1$

It is this result that gives rise to the control coefficient summation theorems.

=== Numerical calculation of elasticity coefficients ===
Elasticities coefficient can also be computed numerically, something that is often done in simulation software.

For example, a small change (say 5%) can be made to the chosen reactant concentration, and the change in the reaction rate recorded. To illustrate this, assume that the reference reaction rate is $v_o$, and the reference reactant concentration, $s_o$. If we increase the reactant concentration by $\Delta s_o$ and record the new reaction rate as $v_1$, then the elasticity can be estimated by using Newton's difference quotient:

$\varepsilon_s^v \simeq \frac{v_1-v_o}{\Delta s_o} \frac{s_o}{v_o}=\frac{v_1-v_o}{v_o} / \frac{s_1-s_o}{s_o}$

A much better estimate for the elasticity can be obtained by doing two separate perturbations in $s_o$. One perturbation to increase $s_o$ and another to decrease $s_o$. In each case, the new reaction rate is recorded; this is called the two-point estimation method. For example, if $v_1$ is the reaction rate when we increase $s_o$, and $v_2$ is the reaction rate when we decrease $s_o$, then we can use the following two-point formula to estimate the elasticity:

$\varepsilon_s^v \simeq \frac{1}{2} \frac{v_1-v_2}{s_1-s_o}\left(\frac{s_o}{v_o}\right)$

== Interpretation of the log form ==
Consider a variable $y$ to be some function $f(x)$, that is $y=f(x)$. If $x$ increases from $x$ to $(x+h)$ then the change in the value of $y$ will be given by $f(x+h)-f(x)$. The proportional change, however, is given by:

$\frac{f(x+h)-f(x)}{f(x)}$

The rate of proportional change at the point $x$ is given by the above expression divided by the step change in the $x$ value, namely $h$:

Rate of proportional change $=$

$\lim _{h \rightarrow 0} \frac{f(x+h)-f(x)}{h f(x)}=\frac{1}{f(x)} \lim _{h \rightarrow 0} \frac{f(x+h)-f(x)}{h}=\frac{1}{y} \frac{d y}{d x}$

Using calculus, we know that

$\frac{d \ln y}{d x} = \frac{1}{y} \frac{d y}{d x}$,

therefore the rate of proportional change equals:

$\frac{d \ln y}{d x}$

This quantity serves as a measure of the rate of proportional change of the function $y$. Just as $d y / d x$ measures the gradient of the curve $y=f(x)$ plotted on a linear scale, $d \ln y / d x$ measures the slope of the curve when plotted on a semi-logarithmic scale, that is the rate of proportional change. For example, a value of $0.05$ means that the curve increases at $5 \%$ per unit $x$.

The same argument can be applied to the case when we plot a function on both $x$ and $y$ logarithmic scales. In such a case, the following result is true:

$\frac{d \ln y}{d \ln x}=\frac{x}{y} \frac{d y}{d x}$

== Differentiating in log space ==
An approach that is amenable to algebraic calculation by computer algebra methods is to differentiate in log space. Since the elasticity can be defined logarithmically, that is:

$$\varepsilon^v_s = \frac{\partial \ln v}{\partial \ln s}$$

differentiating in log space is an obvious approach. Logarithmic differentiation is particularly convenient in algebra software such as Mathematica or Maple, where logarithmic differentiation rules can be defined.

A more detailed examination and the rules differentiating in log space can be found at Elasticity of a function.

== Elasticity matrix ==
The unscaled elasticities can be depicted in matrix form, called the unscaled elasticity matrix, $\mathcal{E}$. Given a network with $m$ molecular species and $n$ reactions, the unscaled elasticity matrix is defined as:

$$\mathcal{E} =
\begin{bmatrix}
\dfrac{\partial v_1}{\partial s_1} & \cdots & \dfrac{\partial v_1}{\partial s_m} \\ \vdots & \ddots & \vdots \\
\dfrac{\partial v_n}{\partial s_1} & \cdots & \dfrac{\partial v_n}{\partial s_m}
\end{bmatrix}.$$

Likewise, is it also possible to define the matrix of scaled elasticities:

$$\mathbf{\varepsilon} =
\begin{bmatrix}
\varepsilon^{v_1}_{s_1} & \cdots & \varepsilon^{v_1}_{s_m} \\ \vdots & \ddots & \vdots \\
\varepsilon^{v_n}_{s_1} & \cdots & \varepsilon^{v_n}_{s_m}
\end{bmatrix}.$$

== See also ==
- Control coefficient (biochemistry)
- Metabolic control analysis
