= Fluxomics =

Fluxomics describes the various approaches that seek to determine the rates of metabolic reactions within a biological entity. While metabolomics can provide instantaneous information on the metabolites in a biological sample, metabolism is a dynamic process. The significance of fluxomics is that metabolic fluxes determine the cellular phenotype. It has the added advantage of being based on the metabolome which has fewer components than the genome or proteome.

Fluxomics falls within the field of systems biology which developed with the appearance of high throughput technologies. Systems biology recognizes the complexity of biological systems and has the broader goal of explaining and predicting this complex behavior.

== Metabolic flux ==
Metabolic flux refers to the rate of metabolite conversion in a metabolic network. For a reaction this rate is a function of both enzyme abundance and enzyme activity. Enzyme concentration is itself a function of transcriptional and translational regulation in addition to the stability of the protein. Enzyme activity is affected by the kinetic parameters of the enzyme, the substrate concentrations, the product concentrations, and the effector molecules concentration. The genomic and environmental effects on metabolic flux are what determine healthy or diseased phenotype.

== Fluxome ==
Similar to genome, transcriptome, proteome, and metabolome, the fluxome is defined as the complete set of metabolic fluxes in a cell. However, unlike the others the fluxome is a dynamic representation of the phenotype. This is due to the fluxome resulting from the interactions of the metabolome, genome, transcriptome, proteome, post-translational modifications and the environment.

== Flux analysis technologies ==
Two important technologies are flux balance analysis (FBA) and ^{13}C-fluxomics. In FBA metabolic fluxes are estimated by first representing the metabolic reactions of a metabolic network in a numerical matrix containing the stoichiometric coefficients of each reaction. The stoichiometric coefficients constrain the system model and are why FBA is only applicable to steady state conditions. Additional constraints can be imposed. By providing constraints the possible set of solutions to the system are reduced. Following the addition of constraints the system model is optimized. Flux-balance analysis resources include the BIGG database, the COBRA toolbox, and FASIMU.

In ^{13}C-fluxomics, metabolic precursors are enriched with ^{13}C before being introduced to the system. Using an analytical technique such as mass spectrometry or nuclear magnetic resonance spectroscopy the level of incorporation of ^{13}C into metabolites can be measured and with stoichiometry the metabolic fluxes can be estimated.

== Stoichiometric and kinetic paradigms ==
A number of different methods, broadly divided into stoichiometric and kinetic paradigms.

Within the stoichiometric paradigm, a number of relatively simple linear algebra methods use restricted metabolic networks or genome-scale metabolic network models to perform flux balance analysis and the array of techniques derived from it. These linear equations are useful for steady state conditions. Dynamic methods are not yet usable. On the more experimental side, metabolic flux analysis allows the empirical estimation of reaction rates by stable isotope labelling.

Within the kinetic paradigm, kinetic modelling of metabolic networks can be purely theoretical, exploring the potential space of dynamic metabolic fluxes under perturbations away from steady state using formalisms such as biochemical systems theory. Such explorations are most informative when accompanied by empirical measurements of the system under study following actual perturbations, as is the case in metabolic control analysis.

== Constraint based reconstruction and analysis ==
Collected methods in fluxomics have been described as "COBRA" methods, for constraint based reconstruction and analysis. A number of software tools and environments have been created for this purpose.

Although it can only be measured indirectly, metabolic flux is the critical link between genes, proteins and the observable phenotype. This is due to the fluxome integrating mass-energy, information, and signaling networks. Fluxomics has the potential to provide a quantifiable representation of the effect the environment has on the phenotype because the fluxome describes the genome environment interaction. In the fields of metabolic engineering and systems biology, fluxomic methods are considered a key enabling technology due to their unique position in the ontology of biological processes, allowing genome scale stoichiometric models to act as a framework for the integration of diverse biological datasets.

== Examples of use in research ==
One potential application of fluxomic techniques is in drug design. Rama et al. used FBA to study the mycolic acid pathway in Mycobacterium tuberculosis. Mycolic acids are known to be important to M. tuberculosis survival and as such its pathway has been studied extensively. This allowed the construction of a model of the pathway and for FBA to analyze it. The results of this found multiple possible drug targets for future investigation.

FBA was used to analyze the metabolic networks of multidrug-resistant Staphylococcus aureus. By performing in silico single and double gene deletions many enzymes essential to growth were identified.
