= Deuteromethane =

Deuterated isotopologue of methane

Monodeuterated methane
Names
- IUPAC name (^{2}H_{1})methane
- Other names Methane-d1; Methyl deuteride Monodeuterated methane Deuteriomethane

Identifiers
CAS Number	676-49-3
3D model (JSmol)	Interactive image
Abbreviations	MeD
ChemSpider	12148
EC Number	694-721-3
PubChem CID	12669
- InChI: InChI=1S/CH4/h1H4/i1D Key: VNWKTOKETHGBQD-MICDWDOJSA-N
- SMILES: [2H]C

Properties
Chemical formula	CH_{3}D
Molar mass	17.049 g·mol^{-1}
Density	0.76 kg/m^{3} (at 0 °C); 0.7 kg/m^{3} (at 25 °C)
Melting point	−182.6 °C (−296.7 °F; 90.5 K)
Boiling point	−161.3 °C (−258.3 °F; 111.8 K)

Hazards
- GHS labelling
Pictograms	(GHS02: Flammable) (GHS04: Compressed Gas)
Signal word	Danger
Hazard statements	H220, H280
Precautionary statements	P203, P210, P222, P280, P377, P381, P403, P410+P403
Flash point	−188 °C (−306.4 °F; 85.1 K)
- Except where otherwise noted, data are given for materials in their standard state (at 25 °C [77 °F], 100 kPa). Infobox references

Deuteromethane, also known as methane-d_{1}, is an isotopologue of methane with the molecular formula CH_{3}D. It contains three hydrogen atoms and one deuterium atom, a stable isotope of hydrogen.

== Spectroscopy ==
The infrared and vibration–rotation spectra of deuteromethane have been investigated experimentally. Early high-resolution measurements identified vibrational–rotational bands near 2,200 and 2,780 cm^{–1}.

Subsequent studies have developed detailed line lists and models of the infrared absorption spectrum of CH_{3}D, including measurements in the near-infrared region around 1.58 μm.

== Atmospheric and planetary observations ==
Deuteromethane has been studied in Earth's atmosphere using infrared solar spectra. Such measurements have been used to investigate deuterium enrichment in atmospheric methane and related chemical processes. CH_{4} is destroyed 1.2 times faster in the atmosphere than CH_{3}D. Since methane originates on the surface of the Earth, the proportion of CH_{3}D increases with height.

== See also ==
- Deuterium
- Methane
- Infrared spectroscopy
