= 1-Hydroxycarotenoid 3,4-desaturase =

Class of enzymes

1-hydroxycarotenoid 3,4-desaturase

Identifiers
- EC no.: 1.3.99.27

Databases
- IntEnz: IntEnz view
- BRENDA: BRENDA entry
- ExPASy: NiceZyme view
- KEGG: KEGG entry
- MetaCyc: metabolic pathway
- PRIAM: profile
- PDB structures: RCSB PDB PDBe PDBsum
Search
- PMC: articles
- PubMed: articles
- NCBI: proteins

1-Hydroxycarotenoid 3,4-desaturase (EC 1.3.99.27, CrtD, hydroxyneurosporene desaturase, carotenoid 3,4-dehydrogenase, 1-hydroxy-carotenoid 3,4-dehydrogenase) is an enzyme with systematic name 1-hydroxy-1,2-dihydrolycopene:acceptor oxidoreductase. This enzyme catalyses the following chemical reaction

1-hydroxy-1,2-dihydrolycopene + acceptor $\rightleftharpoons$ 1-hydroxy-3,4-didehydro-1,2-dihydrolycopene + reduced acceptor

The enzymes from Rubrivivax gelatinosus and Rhodobacter sphaeroides acts primarily on acyclic carotenoids.
