= Dihydroxyphenylalanine transaminase =

Class of enzymes

Identifiers
- EC no.: 2.6.1.49
- CAS no.: 37277-98-8

Databases
- IntEnz: IntEnz view
- BRENDA: BRENDA entry
- ExPASy: NiceZyme view
- KEGG: KEGG entry
- MetaCyc: metabolic pathway
- PRIAM: profile
- PDB structures: RCSB PDB PDBe PDBsum
- Gene Ontology: AmiGO / QuickGO
Search
- PMC: articles
- PubMed: articles
- NCBI: proteins

Dihydroxyphenylalanine transaminase (EC 2.6.1.49) is a pyridoxal phosphate-dependent enzyme that catalyzes the chemical reaction

L-DOPA
+
α-ketoglutaric acid
4-dihydroxyphenylpyruvic acid
+
L-glutamic acid

The two substrates of this enzyme characterised from guinea pig brain are L-DOPA (3,4-dihydroxy-L-phenylalanine) and α-ketoglutaric acid. Its products are 3,4-dihydroxyphenylpyruvic acid and L-glutamic acid. It is part of the pathway in Rhodobacter sphaeroides that breaks down phenylalanine and tyrosine.

This enzyme belongs to the family of transferases, specifically the transaminases, which transfer nitrogenous groups. The systematic name of this enzyme class is 3,4-dihydroxy-L-phenylalanine:2-oxoglutarate aminotransferase. Other names in common use include dopa transaminase, dihydroxyphenylalanine aminotransferase, aspartate-DOPP transaminase (ADT), L-dopa transaminase, dopa aminotransferase, glutamate-DOPP transaminase (GDT), phenylalanine-DOPP transaminase (PDT), DOPA 2-oxoglutarate aminotransferase, and DOPAATS.
