= 3,4-dihydroxyphenylalanine reductive deaminase =

Class of enzymes

Identifiers
- EC no.: 4.3.1.22

Databases
- IntEnz: IntEnz view
- BRENDA: BRENDA entry
- ExPASy: NiceZyme view
- KEGG: KEGG entry
- MetaCyc: metabolic pathway
- PRIAM: profile
- PDB structures: RCSB PDB PDBe PDBsum
Search
- PMC: articles
- PubMed: articles
- NCBI: proteins

The enzyme 3,4-dihydroxyphenylalanine reductive deaminase (EC 4.3.1.22, reductive deaminase, DOPA-reductive deaminase, DOPARDA; systematic name 3,4-dihydroxy-L-phenylalanine ammonia-lyase (3,4-dihydroxyphenylpropanoate-forming)) catalyses the following chemical reaction

L-dopa + 2 NADH $\rightleftharpoons$ 3,4-dihydroxyphenylpropanoate + 2 NAD^{+} + NH_{3}

This enzyme participates in L-phenylalanine catabolism in the anaerobic phototrophic bacterium Rhodobacter sphaeroides OU5.
