= Isotopocule =

Isotopically substituted molecules

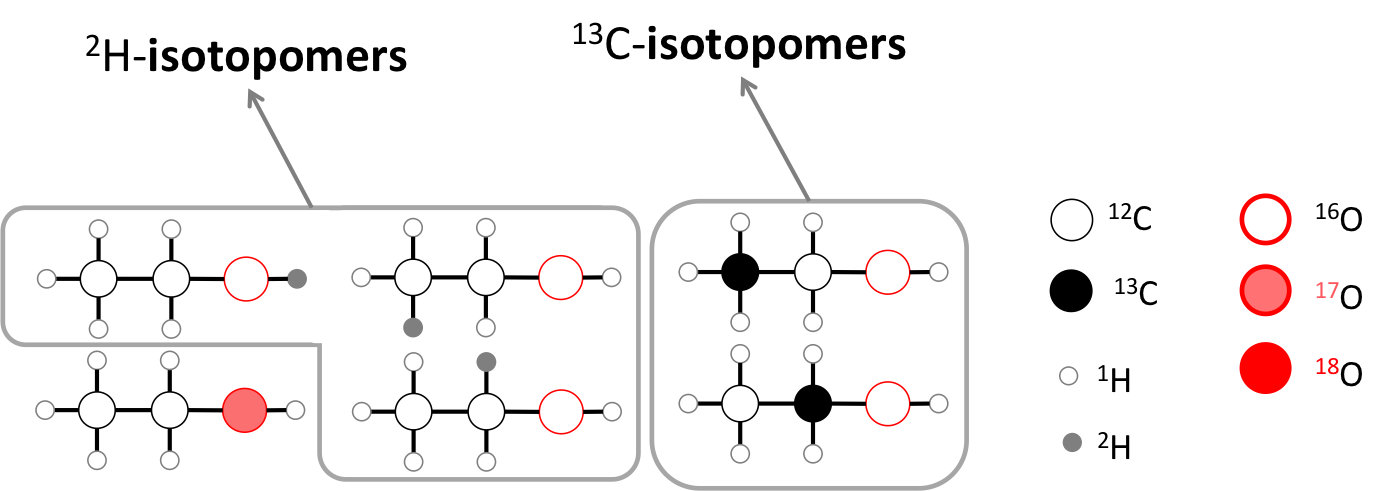
Example of six stable isotopocules of ethanol (i.e. with stable isotopes) out of the total number of 288 stable isotopocules

Isotopocules are isotopically substituted molecules, which differ only in their isotopic composition or their isotopes' intramolecular position. "Isotopocule" is also an umbrella term for the more specific terms "isotopologue" and "isotopomer", coined by Jan Kaiser and Thomas Röckmann in 2008.
