= Cereibacter =

Scientific classification
- Domain: Bacteria
- Kingdom: Pseudomonadati
- Phylum: Pseudomonadota
- Class: Alphaproteobacteria
- Order: Rhodobacterales
- Family: Rhodobacteraceae
- Genus: Cereibacter; Suresh et al. 2015

Type species
- Cereibacter changlensis

Species
- C. azotoformans (Hiraishi et al. 1997) Hördt et al. 2020; C. changlensis (Anil Kumar et al. 2007) Suresh et al. 2015; C. johrii (Girija et al. 2010) Hördt et al. 2020; C. ovatus (Srinivas et al. 2008) Hördt et al. 2020; C. sphaeroides (van Niel 1944) Hördt et al. 2020

Synonyms
- Luteovulum Suresh et al. 2020

Genus of bacteria

Cereibacter is a genus of bacteria from the family of Rhodobacteraceae . Cereibacter changlensis has been isolated from snow from the Changla Pass in the Himalayas.
