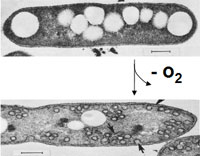
- Cereibacter sphaeroides

Scientific classification
- Domain: Bacteria
- Kingdom: Pseudomonadati
- Phylum: Pseudomonadota
- Class: Alphaproteobacteria
- Order: Rhodobacterales
- Family: Paracoccaceae
- Genus: Cereibacter
- Species: C. sphaeroides

Binomial name
- Cereibacter sphaeroides (van Niel, 1944) Hördt et al. 2020

= Cereibacter sphaeroides =

Species of bacterium

Cereibacter sphaeroides (previously Rhodobacter sphaeroides) is a species of purple bacteria capable of generating energy through photosynthesis. It grows best under anaerobic phototrophic conditions, including both photoheterotrophic and photoautotrophic modes, and under aerobic chemoheterotrophic conditions in the absence of light. C. sphaeroides is also able to fix nitrogen. It is remarkably metabolically diverse, as it is able to grow heterotrophically via fermentation, as well as aerobic and anaerobic respiration. This metabolic versatility has made C. sphaeroides a subject of interest as a microbial cell factory for various biotechnological applications.

Cereibacter sphaeroides has been isolated from deep lakes and stagnant waters.

Cereibacter sphaeroides is a model organism for the study of bacterial photosynthesis. It grows under standard laboratory conditions and exhibits high photosynthetic efficiency. The regulation of its photosynthetic machinery is a significant research focus, as C. sphaeroides possesses an intricate system for sensing O_{2} tension. In response to reduced oxygen tension, the organism forms invaginations in its cytoplasmic membrane that house the photosynthetic apparatus. These structures, known as chromatophores, play a key role in light-driven energy generation.

The genome of C. sphaeroides is also notable for its complexity. It has two circular chromosomes, one of 3 Mb (CI) and one of 900 Kb (CII), and five native plasmids. Although many genes are duplicated between CI and CII, they appear to be differentially regulated. Numerous open reading frames (ORFs) on CII encode proteins of unknown function. Disruption of these genes frequently leads to various types of auxotrophy, suggesting that CII is functionally distinct and not a truncated version of CI.

== Small non-coding RNA ==
Bacterial small RNAs have been identified as components of many regulatory networks. Twenty sRNAs were experimentally identified in Cereibacter spheroides, and the abundant ones were shown to be affected by singlet oxygen (^{1}O_{2}) exposure. ^{1}O_{2} which generates photooxidative stress, is made by bacteriochlorophyll upon exposure to oxygen and light. One of the ^{1}O_{2} induced sRNAs SorY (^{1}O_{2} resistance RNA Y) was shown to be induced under several stress conditions and conferred resistance against ^{1}O_{2} by affecting a metabolite transporter. SorX is the second ^{1}O_{2} induced sRNA that counteracts oxidative stress by targeting mRNA for a transporter. It also has an impact on resistance against organic hydroperoxides. A cluster of four homologous sRNAs called CcsR for conserved CCUCCUCCC motif stress-induced RNA has been shown to play a role in photo-oxidative stress resistance as well. PcrZ (photosynthesis control RNA Z) identified in C. sphaeroides, is a trans-acting sRNA which counteracts the redox-dependent induction of photosynthesis genes, mediated by protein regulators.

== Metabolism ==
C. sphaeroides encodes several terminal oxidases which allow electron transfer to oxygen and other electron acceptors (e.g. DMSO or TMAO). Therefore, this microorganism can respire under oxic, micro-oxic and anoxic conditions under both light and dark conditions. Moreover, it is capable to accept a variety of carbon substrates, including C1 to C4 molecules, sugars and fatty acids. Several pathways for glucose catabolism are present in its genome, such as the Embden–Meyerhof–Parnas pathway (EMP), the Entner–Doudoroff pathway (ED) and the Pentose phosphate pathway (PP). The ED pathway is the predominant glycolytic pathway in this microorganism, whereas the EMP pathway contributing only to a smaller extent. Variation in nutrient availability has important effects on the physiology of this bacterium. For example, decrease in oxygen tensions activates the synthesis of photosynthetic machinery (including photosystems, antenna complexes and pigments). Moreover, depletion of nitrogen in the medium triggers intracellular accumulation of polyhydroxybutyrate, a reserve polymer.

== Biotechnological applications ==
A genome-scale metabolic model exists for this microorganism, which can be used for predicting the effect of gene manipulations on its metabolic fluxes. For facilitating genome editing in this species, a CRISPR/Cas9 genome editing tool was developed and expanded. Moreover, partitioning of intracellular fluxes has been studied in detail, also with the help of ^{13}C-glucose isotopomers. Altogether, these tools can be employed for improving C. sphaeroides as cell factory for industrial biotechnology.

Knowledge of the physiology of C. sphaeroides allowed the development of biotechnological processes for the production of some endogenous compounds. These are hydrogen, polyhydroxybutyrate and isoprenoids (e.g. coenzyme Q10 and carotenoids). Moreover, this microorganism is used also for wastewater treatment. Hydrogen evolution occurs via the activity of the enzyme nitrogenase, whereas isoprenoids are synthesized naturally via the endogenous MEP pathway. The native pathway has been optimized via genetic engineering for improving coenzyme Q10 synthesis. Alternatively, improvement of isoprenoid synthesis was obtained via the introduction of a heterologous mevalonate pathway. Synthetic biology-driven engineering of the metabolism of C. sphaeroides, in combination to the functional replacement the MEP pathway with mevalonate pathway, allowed to further increase bioproduction of isoprenoids in this species.

== Synonyms ==
- Rhodococcus minor Molisch 1907
- Rhodococcus capsulatus Molisch 1907
- Rhodosphaera capsulata (Molisch) Buchanan 1918
- Rhodosphaera minor (Molisch) Bergey et al. 1923
- Rhodorrhagus minor (Molisch) Bergey et al. 1925
- Rhodorrhagus capsulatus (Molisch) Bergey et al. 1925
- Rhodorrhagus capsulatus Bergey et al. 1939
- Rhodopseudomonas sphaeroides van Niel 1944
- Rhodopseudomonas spheroides van Niel 1944
- Rhodorrhagus spheroides (van Niel) Brisou 1955
- Rhodobacter sphaeroides (van Niel 1944) Imhoff et al. 1984

== Bibliography ==
- Inomata Tsuyako, Higuchi Masataka (1976), Incorporation of tritium into cell materials of Rhodpseudomonas spheroides from tritiated water in the medium under aerobic conditions; Journal of Biochemistry 80(3), p569-578, 1976-09
