= MTBSTFA =

Names
- IUPAC name N-[tert-Butyl(dimethyl)silyl]-2,2,2-trifluoro-N-methylacetamide
- Systematic IUPAC name N-(tert-Butyldimethylsilyl)-N-methyltrifluoroacetamide
- Other names N-(t-Butyldimethylsilyl)-N-methyltrifluoroacetamide

Identifiers
CAS Number	77377-52-7
3D model (JSmol)	Interactive image
ChEBI	CHEBI:85060
ChemSpider	2006425
ECHA InfoCard	100.116.249
EC Number	616-455-9
PubChem CID	2724275
CompTox Dashboard (EPA)	DTXSID50998589
- InChI: InChI=1S/C9H18F3NOSi/c1-8(2,3)15(5,6)13(4)7(14)9(10,11)12/h1-6H3 Key: QRKUHYFDBWGLHJ-UHFFFAOYSA-N
- SMILES: O=C(N(C)[Si](C)(C)C(C)(C)C)C(F)(F)F

Properties
Chemical formula	C_{9}H_{18}F_{3}NOSi
Molar mass	241.329 g·mol^{−1}
Appearance	colorless
Density	1.023 g/mL
Melting point	168–170 °C (334–338 °F; 441–443 K)

Hazards
- GHS labelling
Pictograms	(GHS02: Flammable) (GHS07: Exclamation mark)
Signal word	Warning
Hazard statements	H226, H315, H319, H335
Precautionary statements	P210, P233, P240, P241, P242, P243, P261, P264, P264+P265, P271, P280, P302+P352, P303+P361+P353, P304+P340, P305+P351+P338, P319, P321, P332+P317, P337+P317, P362+P364, P370+P378, P403+P233, P403+P235, P405, P501
- Except where otherwise noted, data are given for materials in their standard state (at 25 °C [77 °F], 100 kPa). Infobox references

MTBSTFA (systematic name N-(tert-butyldimethylsilyl)-N-methyltrifluoroacetamide) is a reagent used for derivatizing compounds to make them easier to analyze by gas chromatography. It is one of several reagents used to covalently link alkylsilyl groups to certain functional groups of the compound to be analyzed. The resulting analytes are less polar and are less susceptible to hydrogen bonding. MTBSTFA adds t-butyldimethylsilyl to convert, for example, alcohols to tert-butyldimethylsilyl ethers. MTBSTFA, and the structurally related BSTFA that adds trimethylsilyl groups, are the two most commonly used silyl derivatizing agents.

MTBSTFA is being used on the Curiosity Mars rover as part of experiments analyzing the composition of rock samples to search for organic molecules.
