= Isotopologue =

Molecules which differ only in isotope composition

In chemistry, isotopologues (also spelled isotopologs) are molecules that differ only in their isotopic composition. They have the same chemical formula and bonding arrangement of atoms, but at least one atom has a different number of neutrons than the parent.

An example is water, whose hydrogen-related isotopologues are: "light water" (HOH or H_{2}O), "semi-heavy water" with the deuterium isotope in equal proportion to protium (HDO or ^{1}H^{2}HO), "heavy water" with two deuterium atoms (D_{2}O or ^{2}H_{2}O); and "super-heavy water" or tritiated water (T_{2}O or ^{3}H_{2}O, as well as HTO [^{1}H^{3}HO] and DTO [^{2}H^{3}HO], where some or all of the hydrogen is the radioactive tritium isotope). Oxygen-related isotopologues of water include the commonly available form of heavy-oxygen water (H_{2}^{18}O) and the more difficult to separate version with the ^{17}O isotope. Both elements may be replaced by isotopes, for example in the doubly labeled water isotopologue D_{2}^{18}O. Altogether, there are 9 different stable water isotopologues, and 9 radioactive isotopologues involving tritium, for a total of 18. However only certain ratios are possible in mixture, due to prevalent hydrogen swapping.

The atom(s) of the different isotope may be anywhere in a molecule, so the difference is in the net chemical formula. If a compound has several atoms of the same element, any one of them could be the altered one, and it would still be the same isotopologue. When considering the different locations of the same isotope, the term isotopomer, first proposed by Seeman and Paine in 1992, is used. Isotopomerism is analogous to constitutional isomerism or stereoisomerism of different elements in a structure. Depending on the formula and the symmetry of the structure, there might be several isotopomers of one isotopologue. For example, ethanol has the molecular formula C_{2}H_{6}O. Mono-deuterated ethanol, C_{2}H_{5}DO or C_{2}H_{5}^{2}HO, is an isotopologue of it. The structural formulas CH_{3}−CH_{2}−O−D and CH_{2}D−CH_{2}−O−H are two isotopomers of that isotopologue.

== Singly substituted isotopologues ==
=== Analytical chemistry applications ===
Singly substituted isotopologues may be used for nuclear magnetic resonance experiments, where deuterated solvents such as deuterated chloroform (CDCl_{3} or C^{2}HCl_{3}) do not interfere with the solutes' ^{1}H signals, and in investigations of the kinetic isotope effect.

=== Geochemical applications ===
In the field of stable isotope geochemistry, isotopologues of simple molecules containing rare heavy isotopes of carbon, oxygen, hydrogen, nitrogen, and sulfur are used to trace equilibrium and kinetic processes in natural environments and in Earth's past.

== Doubly substituted isotopologues ==
Measurement of the abundance of clumped isotopes (doubly substituted isotopologues) of gases has been used in the field of stable isotope geochemistry to trace equilibrium and kinetic processes in the environment inaccessible by analysis of singly substituted isotopologues alone.

Currently measured doubly substituted isotopologues include:

- Carbon dioxide: ^{13}C^{18}O^{16}O
- Methane: ^{13}CH_{3}D and ^{12}CH_{2}D_{2}
- Oxygen: ^{18}O_{2} and ^{17}O^{18}O
- Nitrogen: ^{15}N_{2}
- Nitrous oxide: ^{14}N^{15}N^{18}O and ^{15}N^{14}N^{18}O

=== Analytical requirements ===
Because of the relative rarity of the heavy isotopes of C, H, and O, isotope-ratio mass spectrometry (IRMS) of doubly substituted species requires larger volumes of sample gas and longer analysis times than traditional stable isotope measurements, thereby requiring extremely stable instrumentation. Also, the doubly-substituted isotopologues are often subject to isobaric interferences, as in the methane system where ^{13}CH_{5}^{+} and ^{12}CH_{3}D^{+} ions interfere with measurement of the ^{12}CH_{2}D_{2}^{+} and ^{13}CH_{3}D^{+} species at mass 18. A measurement of such species requires either very high mass resolving power to separate one isobar from another, or modeling of the contributions of the interfering species to the abundance of the species of interest. These analytical challenges are significant: The first publication precisely measuring doubly substituted isotopologues did not appear until 2004, though singly substituted isotopologues had been measured for decades previously.

As an alternative to more conventional gas source IRMS instruments, tunable diode laser absorption spectroscopy has also emerged as a method to measure doubly substituted species free from isobaric interferences, and has been applied to the methane isotopologue ^{13}CH_{3}D.

=== Equilibrium fractionation ===
When a light isotope is replaced with a heavy isotope (e.g., ^{13}C for ^{12}C), the bond between the two atoms will vibrate more slowly, thereby lowering the zero-point energy of the bond and acting to stabilize the molecule. An isotopologue with a doubly substituted bond is therefore slightly more thermodynamically stable, which will tend to produce a higher abundance of the doubly substituted (or “clumped”) species than predicted by the statistical abundance of each heavy isotope (known as a stochastic distribution of isotopes). This effect increases in magnitude with decreasing temperature, so the abundance of the clumped species is related to the temperature at which the gas was formed or equilibrated. By measuring the abundance of the clumped species in standard gases formed in equilibrium at known temperatures, the thermometer can be calibrated and applied to samples with unknown abundances.

=== Kinetic fractionation ===
The abundances of multiply substituted isotopologues can also be affected by kinetic processes. As for singly substituted isotopologues, departures from thermodynamic equilibrium in a doubly-substituted species can implicate the presence of a particular reaction taking place. Photochemistry occurring in the atmosphere has been shown to alter the abundance of ^{18}O_{2} from equilibrium, as has photosynthesis. Measurements of ^{13}CH_{3}D and ^{12}CH_{2}D_{2} can identify microbial processing of methane and have been used to demonstrate the significance of quantum tunneling in the formation of methane, as well as mixing and equilibration of multiple methane reservoirs. Variations in the relative abundances of the two N_{2}O isotopologues ^{14}N^{15}N^{18}O and ^{15}N^{14}N^{18}O can distinguish whether N_{2}O has been produced by bacterial denitrification or by bacterial nitrification.

== Multiple substituted isotopologues ==
=== Biochemical applications ===
Multiple substituted isotopologues may be used for nuclear magnetic resonance or mass spectrometry experiments, where isotopologues are used to elucidate metabolic pathways in a qualitative (detect new pathways) or quantitative (detect quantitative share of a pathway) approach. A popular example in biochemistry is the use of uniform labelled glucose (U-^{13}C glucose), which is metabolized by the organism under investigation (e. g. bacterium, plant, or animal) and whose signatures can later be detected in newly formed amino acid or metabolically cycled products.

=== Mass spectrometry applications ===
Resulting from either naturally occurring isotopes or artificial isotopic labeling, isotopologues can be used in various mass spectrometry applications.

==== Applications of natural isotopologues ====
The relative mass spectral intensity of natural isotopologues, calculable from the fractional abundances of the constituent elements, is exploited by mass spectrometry practitioners in quantitative analysis and unknown compound identification:

1. To identify the more likely molecular formulas for an unknown compound based on the matching between the observed isotope abundance pattern in an experiment and the expected isotope abundance patterns for given molecular formulas.
2. To expand the linear dynamic response range of the mass spectrometer by following multiple isotopologues, with an isotopologue of lower abundance still generating linear response even while the isotopologues of higher abundance giving saturated signals.

==== Applications of isotope labeling ====
A compound tagged by replacing specific atoms with the corresponding isotopes can facilitate the following mass spectrometry methods:

1. Metabolic flux analysis (MFA)
2. Stable isotopically labeled internal standards for quantitative analysis

== See also ==
- Mass (mass spectrometry)
- Isotope-ratio mass spectrometry
- Isotopomer
- Clumped isotopes
- Isotopocule
