= Isotopomer =

Molecules with same isotopes in different positions

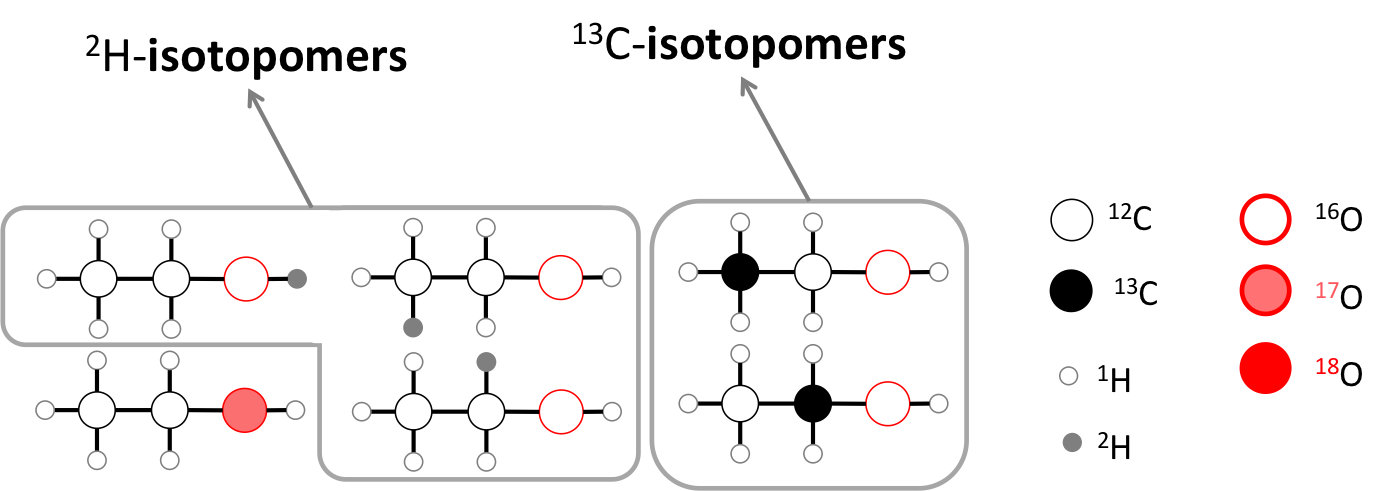
Isotopomers of isotopically modified ethanol. The molecule at the bottom left is not an isotopomer of any other depicted molecule.

Isotopomers or isotopic isomers are isomers which differ by isotopic substitution, and which have the same number of atoms of each isotope but in a different arrangement. For example, CH_{3}OD and CH_{2}DOH are two isotopomers of monodeuterated methanol.

The molecules may be either structural isomers (constitutional isomers) or stereoisomers depending on the location of the isotopes. Isotopomers have applications in areas including nuclear magnetic resonance spectroscopy, reaction kinetics, and biochemistry.

== Description ==
Isotopomers or isotopic isomers are isomers with isotopic atoms, having the same number of each isotope of each element but differing in their positions in the molecule. The result is that the molecules are either constitutional isomers or stereoisomers solely based on isotopic location. The term isotopomer was first proposed by Seeman and Paine in 1992 to distinguish isotopic isomers from isotopologues (isotopic homologues).

== Examples ==
- CH_{3}CHDCH_{3} and CH_{3}CH_{2}CH_{2}D are a pair of structural isotopomers of propane.
- (R)- and (S)-CH_{3}CHDOH are isotopic stereoisomers of ethanol.
- (Z)- and (E)-CH_{3}CH=CHD are examples of isotopic stereoisomers of propene.

== Use ==
=== ^{13}C-NMR ===
In nuclear magnetic resonance spectroscopy, the highly abundant ^{12}C isotope does not produce any signal whereas the comparably rare ^{13}C isotope is easily detected. As a result, carbon isotopomers of a compound can be studied by carbon-13 NMR to learn about the different carbon atoms in the structure. Each individual structure that contains a single ^{13}C isotope provides data about the structure in its immediate vicinity. A large sample of a chemical contains a mixture of all such isotopomers, so a single spectrum of the sample contains data about all carbons in it. Nearly all of the carbon in normal samples of carbon-based chemicals is ^{12}C, with only about 1% abundance of ^{13}C, so there is only about a 1% abundance of the total of the singly-substituted isotopologues, and exponentially smaller amounts of structures having two or more ^{13}C in them. The rare case where two adjacent carbon atoms in a single structure are both ^{13}C causes a detectable coupling effect between them as well as signals for each one itself. The INADEQUATE correlation experiment uses this effect to provide evidence for which carbon atoms in a structure are attached to each other, which can be useful for determining the actual structure of an unknown chemical.

=== Reaction kinetics ===
In reaction kinetics, a rate effect is sometimes observed between different isotopomers of the same chemical. This kinetic isotope effect can be used to study reaction mechanisms by analyzing how the differently massed atom is involved in the process.

=== Biochemistry ===
In biochemistry, differences between the isotopomers of biochemicals such as starches is of practical importance in archaeology. They offer clues to the diet of prehistoric humans that lived as long ago as Paleolithic times. This is because naturally occurring carbon dioxide contains both ^{12}C and ^{13}C. Monocots, such as rice and oats, differ from dicots, such as potatoes and tree fruits, in the relative amounts of ^{12}CO_{2} and ^{13}CO_{2} that they incorporate into their tissues as products of photosynthesis. When tissues of such subjects are recovered, usually tooth or bone, the relative isotopic content can give useful indications of the main source of the staple foods of the subjects of the investigations.

== Cumomer ==
A cumomer is a set of isotopomers sharing similar properties and is a concept that relates to metabolic flux analysis. The concept was developed in 1999. In a metabolic cascade, many molecules will contain the same pattern of isotope labelling. In order to simplify the analysis of such cascades, molecules with identically labelled atoms are aggregated into a virtual molecule called a cumomer (a conflation of cumulative and isotopomer).

== See also ==
- Mass (mass spectrometry)
- Isotopocule
