= Metabolic network =

Set of biological pathways

A metabolic network is the complete set of metabolic and physical processes that determine the physiological and biochemical properties of a cell. As such, these networks comprise the chemical reactions of metabolism, the metabolic pathways, as well as the regulatory interactions that guide these reactions.

With the sequencing of complete genomes, it is now possible to reconstruct the network of biochemical reactions in many organisms, from bacteria to human. Several of these networks are available online: Kyoto Encyclopedia of Genes and Genomes (KEGG), EcoCyc, BioCyc and metaTIGER. Metabolic networks are powerful tools for studying and modelling metabolism.

Major metabolic pathways in metro-style map. Click any text (name of pathway or metabolites) to link to the corresponding article.
Single lines: pathways common to most lifeforms. Double lines: pathways not in humans (occurs in e.g. plants, fungi, prokaryotes). Orange nodes: carbohydrate metabolism. Violet nodes: photosynthesis. Red nodes: cellular respiration. Pink nodes: cell signaling. Blue nodes: amino acid metabolism. Grey nodes: vitamin and cofactor metabolism. Brown nodes: nucleotide and protein metabolism. Green nodes: lipid metabolism.

== Uses ==
Metabolic networks can be used to detect comorbidity patterns in diseased patients. Certain diseases, such as obesity and diabetes, can be present in the same individual concurrently, sometimes one disease being a significant risk factor for the other disease. The disease phenotypes themselves are normally the consequence of the cell's inability to breakdown or produce an essential substrate. However, an enzyme defect at one reaction may affect the fluxes of other subsequent reactions. These cascading effects couple the metabolic diseases associated with subsequent reactions resulting in comorbidity effects. Thus, metabolic disease networks can be used to determine if two disorders are connected due to their correlated reactions.

== See also ==
- Cellular model
- Metabolic network modelling
- Metabolic pathway
