= Rappaport (surname) =

Rappaport is an Ashkenazi surname, with the individuals bearing it being descendants of the Rabbinic Kohenic Rappaport family. Variants of the name include Rapaport, Rapa Porto, Rappeport, Rappoport and Rapoport.

== Rappaport ==
- Alfred Rappaport (diplomat) (1868–1946), Austrian diplomat and writer
- Alfred Rappaport (economist) (born 1932), American economist
- Andrew S. Rappaport (born 1957), American Silicon Valley venture capitalist
- Assaf Rappaport (born 1983), Israeli billionaire entrepreneur
- Ben Rappaport (born 1986), American television actor
- Bruce Rappaport (1922–2010), Israeli international banker and financier
- Daniel Rappaport (born 1970), American film producer
- David Rappaport (1951–1990), English actor
- David Rappaport (designer) (1914–2010), American fashion manufacturer, designer, artist
- Edward Rappaport (born ca. 1957), acting director of the U.S. National Hurricane Center
- Emil Stanisław Rappaport (1877–1965), Polish judge
- Herbert Rappaport (1908–1983), Austrian-born screenwriter and film director (known as Gerbert Rappaport in USSR)
- Helen Rappaport (born 1947), English actress, author, historian
- Jerome Lyle Rappaport (1927–2021), American attorney and civic figure in Massachusetts
- Jill Rappaport (born 1964), American author, journalist, television personality
- Jim Rappaport (born 1956), American real estate developer in Massachusetts
- Kurt Rappaport (born c. 1958), American real estate developer
- Laurence Rappaport (1940–2020), American politician
- Mark Rappaport (born c. 1942), American film director
- Mark Rappaport (creature effects artist) (born 1954), American special-effects specialist
- Mat Rappaport (born 1971), American artist, curator, educator
- Ray Rappaport (1922–2010), American scientist in cell biology
- Rhoda Rappaport (1935–2009), American historian of science
- Roy Rappaport (1926–1997), American anthropologist
- Ruth Rappaport (1923–2010), German-born American librarian
- Samuel Rappaport (1932–2016), American politician in Pennsylvania
- Saul Rappaport (born c. 1940), American physicist
- Sheeri Rappaport (born 1977), American television actress
- Summer Rappaport (born 1991), American triathlete
- Theodore Rappaport (born 1960), American electrical engineer
- Uriel Rappaport (1935–2019), Israeli historian

== Rappeport ==
- Alan Rappeport, American journalist
- Carole MacGillvray Rappeport
- Donald Rappeport, founder of Donlen
- Phyllis Rappeport (1929–2020), American pianist, teacher, and chamber musician
- Sarah Rappeport (1890–1980), Austro-Hungarian Jewish pioneer of the Third Aliyah, chemist, and an author

== Rappoport ==
- Boris Rappoport (born 1946), Russian football coach
- Charles Rappoport (1865–1941), Russian naturalized French politician and intellectual
- Julius Rappoport (born 1851), Russian silversmith
- Kseniya (Xenia) Rappoport (born 1974), Russian actress

== Rapaport ==
- Alexandra Rapaport (born 1971), Swedish film and stage actress
- Amir Rapaport (born 1970), Israeli journalist, media personality
- David Rapaport (psychologist) (1911–1960), Hungarian-born American psychologist
- Eldar Rapaport (born c. 1970), Israeli film director
- Martin Rapaport (born 1952), Belgian-American diamond dealer
- Matilda Rapaport (1986–2016), Swedish skier
- Michael Rapaport (born 1970), American actor, media personality
- Rosemary Rapaport (1918–2011), English musical educator
- Rudolf Ray Rapaport (1891–1984), Latvian-born artist
- William J. Rapaport (born c. 1945), American educator

== Rapoport ==
- Aaron Rapoport (born 1954), American photographer
- Abraham Rapoport (Schrenzel) (1584–1651), Polish Talmudic scholar
- Adam Rapoport (born 1969), former editor-in-chief of Bon Appétit magazine
- Alek Rapoport (1933–1997), Ukrainian-born U.S. artist
- Amnon Rapoport (1936–2022), Israel-born professor of quantitative psychology and interactive decision-making behavior
- Amos Rapoport (born 1929), Polish-born professor of architecture
- Anatol Rapoport (1911–2007), Russian-born U.S. mathematical psychologist and game theorist
- Bernard Rapoport (1917–2012), American businessman, entrepreneur, philanthropist
- Chaim Rapoport (born 1963), British rabbi, author, educator
- Dan Rapoport (1968–2022), Latvian-born American international financier and philanthropist
- David C. Rapoport (1929–2024), American political scientist, specializing in terrorism
- Eda Rapoport (1890–1968), Latvian-born American composer, musical conducator, pianist
- Eduardo H. Rapoport (1927–2017), Argentinian ecologist
- Henry Rapoport (1918–2002), American chemist
- I. C. Rapoport (born 1937), American photojournalist and screenwriter
- Ian Rapoport (born 1980), U.S. sports journalist, media personality
- Ingeborg Rapoport (1912–2017), Cameroon-born German pediatrician and neonatologist
- Isaac ha-Kohen Rapoport, 18th century rabbi
- Judith L. Rapoport (1933–2026), American psychiatrist
- Leo Port (Rapoport; changed on arrival to Australia) (1922–1978), Polish-born Lord Mayor of Sydney 1975–1978
- Lev Pavlovich Rapoport (1920–2000), Russian nuclear physicist
- Louis Rapoport (1942–1991), U.S.-born Israeli newspaper editor
- Michael Rapoport (born 1948), German mathematician
- Miles S. Rapoport (born 1949), American politician and nonprofit executive
- Natalie Rapoport (1927–2022), American politician
- Nathan Rapoport (1911–1987), Polish-born sculptor
- Paul Rapoport (1940–1987), American attorney, gay-rights advocate
- Paul Rapoport (music researcher) (born 1948), Canadian musicologist, music critic, composer and professor at McMaster University in Hamilton, Ontario
- Rhona Rapoport (1927–2011), South African social scientist
- Samuel Mitja Rapoport (1912–2004), Russian-born German physician, biochemist, and communist
- Shloyme Zanvl Rapoport (Russian: Шлоймэ-Занвл Рапопорт), birth name of S. An-sky, Russian Jewish author, playwright, researcher of Jewish folklore, polemicist, and cultural and political activist.
- Solomon Judah Loeb Rapoport (1786–1867), Galician Jewish rabbi and scholar
- Sonya Rapoport (1923–2015), American artist, computer-artistry pioneer
- Tom Rapoport (born 1947), German-born U.S. cell biologist at Harvard Medical School
- Vladimir Rapoport (1907–1975), Soviet cinematographer

== See also ==
- Rapoport's rule, an ecological hypothesis
- 16180 Rapoport, a main-belt asteroid
