= Melissa Potter =

American interdisciplinary artist

Melissa Potter is an American interdisciplinary artist who works in handmade paper, printmaking, traditional crafts, writing, and video. She is a three-time Fulbright award recipient (Serbia, Bosnia and Herzegovina) and was Director of the MFA in Book & Paper at Columbia College Chicago from 2014 – 2017. She holds a BFA from Virginia Commonwealth University (VCU) and a MFA from the Mason Gross School of the Arts at Rutgers University.

== Career ==
Potter's work revolves around ideas of gender, identity, and feminism. Her interests in socially activist art and the democratic potential of print media has resulted in a longstanding engagement with art from Eastern Europe, specifically Russia, the Republic of Georgia, Bosnia and Herzegovina, and Serbia. Her projects have received numerous awards from ArtsLink, the Craft Research Fund, the Trust for Mutual Understanding, and the Soros Fund for Arts and Culture, among others.

== Works ==
Potter's early work was featured at the Bronx Museum of the Arts through the Artist in the Marketplace (AIM) program. She was in the 'Regarding Gloria' exhibition curated by Lauren Ross and Catherine Morris at White Columns, an alternative not-for-profit arts space. Her film, 'Like Other Girls Do' featuring Stana Cerovic and edited by Jelena Jovcic has been featured at festivals including the Reeling LGBT festival, the Bangalore Queer Film Festival, the Merlinka Festival, and at galleries and museums including Albright College in an exhibition curated by Erin Riley Lopez. Other recent projects include collaborations called 'Homeland: Chicago and Belgrade Diasporas' with Chicago-based artist Mat Rappaport, 'Craft Power' with Brooklyn-based artist Miriam Schaer, and 'Seeds InService' with California-born artist Maggie Puckett. In 2019, Seeds InService was included in the Svalbard Global Seed Vault art collection.

== Curating ==
Potter co-curated 'Social Paper: Hand Papermaking in the Context of Socially Engaged Art' with Jessica Cochran. It was the first exhibition to consider hand papermaking within the social practice realm. The project was funded by the Craft Research Fund and the Clinton Hill Foundation. Other curatorial projects include 'Among Tender Roots', the first retrospective of artist Laura Anderson Barbata's hand papermaking work in socially engaged projects, and Revolution and Point Zero: Feminist Social Practice co-curated with Neysa Page-Lieberman.

== Writing ==
Potter has published widely on various topics including the art scene in the former Yugoslavia, social practice, and feminism. Her writing has been published in several publications including BOMB, Metropolis M, Flash Art, and Art Papers. Potter co-authored, with curator Neysa Page-Lieberman, the Feminist Social Practice Manifesto which was first published in ASAP Journal.

== Bibliography ==
Romero, Josue. "Melissa Potter and The Revolution in the Art World," Study Breaks, 2018.
