= David Rappaport (disambiguation) =

David Rappaport (1951–1990) was an English actor.

David Rappaport may also refer to:

- David Rappaport (designer) (1914–2010), fashion manufacturer and designer
- David Rapaport (1911–1960), clinical psychologist
- David Rappoport (1890–1941), rabbi and rosh yeshiva
- David C. Rapoport (1929–2024), political scientist
