= Maria Szécsi =

Austrian economist (1914 – 1984)

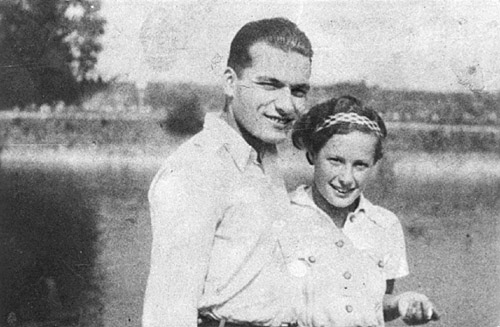
Maria Szécsi with Jura Soyfer

Maria Szécsi (23 December 1914 – 14 June 1984), also called as Maria Szecsi, was an Austrian economist who contributed to the reform of the Austrian cartel law. She was active in the Communist Party of Austria.

== Biography ==
Born on 23 December 1914 in Budapest, Maria Szécsi was the daughter of Egon Szécsi (1882– 1941) and his wife Sophie Polanyi. In 1919 her parents came to Vienna from Budapest after the Hungarian revolution. From her childhood, she actively engaged in socialist ideas under the influence of her uncle, Karl Polanyi. She was associated with the social democrat youth organization Rote Falken and the socialist high school group.

Szécsi studied at the University of Vienna. After the Austrian Civil War in 1934 and the banning of the Social Democratic Party of Austria, she worked for the underground organization. She was captured and sentenced to gaol. She was later dismissed from the University of Vienna which eventually led to her discontinuing her studies.

Following the German occupation of Austria, she emigrated to the United States. There she studied history, economy and political science at the Universities of Cincinnati and Chicago, and graduated with a master's degree. She then became a lecturer at Roosevelt University, Chicago.

From 1937 she lived in Cincinnati, Ohio, with her first husband, the doctor and biochemist Samuel Mitja Rapoport. After her divorce from Rapoport, she returned to Austria in 1948 and again became active in the Communist Party of Austria under the pseudonym Marie Rapp. She worked at the department of social policy of the Communist World Trade Union.

After the Hungarian Revolution of 1956 she left the Communist Party in May 1957 following her critical approach towards its policies. She subsequently joined the department of economics at the Vienna Chamber of Labor under Eduard March whom she married later. Between 1960 and 1974, she worked at the Austrian Chamber of Labour. During her later years at the Chamber of labour, she engaged in research and publications.

From 1957 to 1978, she served as chief editor of the Wirtschaft und Gesellschaft journal which highlighted the economic and social concerns of trade unions at a scholarly level on an empirical basis. Her major research works focused on income distribution, prices, and private consumption in Austria.

She also taught at Webster University, Vienna.

She died on 14 June 1984.
