= 2014 Dijon attack =

Vehicle ramming attack in Dijon, France

- Location of Côte-d'Or within France
- Location: Dijon, France
- Date: 21 December 2014
- Attack type: Vehicle-ramming attack
- Weapon: Car
- Deaths: 0
- Injuries: 13 (two seriously)
- Motive: Islamic terrorism

On 21 December 2014, a man in the French city of Dijon was arrested after a vehicle-ramming attack in which he drove a van into pedestrians in five areas of the city in the space of half an hour. Thirteen people were injured, two of them seriously.

The alleged perpetrator had a record of mental disorder and no known links with terrorist groups. The local prosecutor said the incident was not linked to terrorism and the Interior Ministry believed that he had acted alone, although anti-terrorism investigators opened an inquiry into the attack.

== Attack ==
In the space of half an hour, the alleged attacker, identified only as Nacer B, drove a Renault Clio van into groups of pedestrians in five separate areas of the city. Thirteen people were injured; two of them sustained serious injuries. The accused allegedly shouted Allahu Akbar, brandished a knife, and claimed that he was "acting on behalf of the children of Palestine." According to Dijon city prosecutor, Marie-Christine Tarrare, the accused had become “very agitated” after watching a television program about the plight of children in Chechnya.

== Suspect ==
The man arrested was reported to be "40-year-old man of Arab origin" and "Algerian and Moroccan descent." He had been known to the police for minor offenses committed over the course of 20 years, and had repeatedly been treated for “serious and long-established psychiatric issues”.

French Interior Minister Bernard Cazeneuve described him as "very unstable". The local prosecutor said the incident was not linked to terrorism and the Interior Ministry believed that he had acted alone, although anti-terrorism investigators opened an inquiry into the attack.

The Times described Dijon as an "apparently lone-wolf Islamist attack." The Financial Times described it together with the attacks in Tours and Nantes as "the first Isis-linked attacks in the country." According to The Globe and Mail, this attack was "apparently inspired by a video" circulated by ISIL calling on French Muslims to attack non-Muslims using vehicles. According to David C. Rapoport of the University of California, Los Angeles, these three attacks can be understood in the context of the rise of the Islamic State in Syria. "In September 2014, after the U.S. organized its airstrikes, the Islamic State’s chief spokesman called on Muslims in Western countries to find an infidel and ‘smash his head with a rock’, poison him, run him over with a car or ‘destroy his crops’. Two months later a video released in French contained virtually the same message, and a series of strange 'lone wolf' attacks followed on three consecutive days, the perpetrators declaring “'God is Great' in Arabic. Three policemen were stabbed in Joué-lès-Tours, and vehicles were used to run over eleven pedestrians in Dijon and ten in Nantes." The Financial Times describes the 20 December 2014 Tours police station stabbing, this attack on 21 December, and the 22 December 2014 Nantes attack as "the first Isis-linked attacks" in France.

In his 2017 book, Words Are Weapons: Inside ISIS’s Rhetoric of Terror, Philippe-Joseph Salazar, wrote that "the French government strenuously denied that (this and the 2014 Nantes attack) were terrorist attacks, but terrorist experts dissented, referring to them as examples of a 'low intensity permanent warfare.'" Citing this 2014 Dijon car attack, Mark Silinsky of the United States Army War College describes a view held by "some in the West... that political violence perpetrated by Muslims in the name of Islam is not and cannot be authentically Islamic... In this view, the perpetrators are fueled with a rage unconnected to any religion. Even when perpetrators roar “Allahu Akbar” or bellow praises for the Caliphate, these proclamations are dismissed as empty or misguided rhetoric." In their 2017 article, Is there a Nexus Between Terrorist Involvement and Mental Health in the Age of the Islamic State?, Emily Corner and Paul Gil, describe this attack as example of the "tendency to try to dismiss the possibility of terrorism altogether" in instances where a "confirmed diagnosis" is available.

== Context ==
In his 2017 book Migration, Terrorism, and the Future of a Divided Europe: A Continent Transformed, Christopher Deliso discusses this attack in the context of a series of "terrorist" attacks "carried out by immigrants (and new migrants)" using "very basic but deadly weapons" in Western countries, noting that this particular attack occurred after ISIS released a video calling on Muslims in France to run non-Muslims over "with your cars."

The attack has been described as one of a series of terror attacks on French soil, as a contemporary example of vehicle ramming as a terrorism tactic, and as one of the many ISIS-inspired lone wolf terrorist attacks worldwide.

== Impact ==
In what The New York Times described as an effort "to reassure a jittery nation" government deployed 300 troops onto French streets "to guard against copycat attacks inspired by" the 20 December 2014 Tours police station stabbing, this attack on 21 December, and the 22 December 2014 Nantes attack on the city's Christmas market in which ten people were injured and one was killed. According to Public Radio International, these three attacks "prompted the French government to step up security at police and fire stations across the country." According to Le Monde, following the series of three attacks police were ordered keep their weapons constantly within reach, even when inside their stations, and to wear their protective vests.

In addition to these immediate responses by the French government, according to CNN security analyst Peter Bergen writing in 2016, this attack was one of a number of Vehicle-ramming attacks that forced police in a number of countries to reconsider methods of protecting crowded public spaces.

According to The Times, this series of three attacks (Dijon, Nantes, Tours) caused Whitehall to move protective measures against "lone volatile extremist(s)" intent on committing vehicle ramming attacks "to the top of the agenda," with a list of recommended measures including bollards, building design, and standards to insure that concrete sets properly.

Manuel Valls, the Prime Minister of France, expressed his "solidarity" with the victims of the attack via Twitter.
