= 2014 Tours police station stabbing =

2014 terrorist attack in France

2014 Tours stabbing attack
- Location: 47.3520°N 0.6622°E; Joué-lès-Tours, France
- Date: 20 December 2014
- Target: Police officers
- Attack type: Stabbing
- Weapon: Knife
- Deaths: 1 (the perpetrator)
- Injuries: 3
- Perpetrator: Bertrand Nzohabonayo
- Motive: Islamist terrorism inspired by ISIL

On 20 December 2014, a man in Joué-lès-Tours near the city of Tours in central France entered a police station and attacked officers with a knife, shouting "Allahu Akbar" and injuring three before he was shot and killed. The attack was categorised as a case of religiously inspired terrorism by Europol, and has been reported by Europol as well as mappings by CNN and AFP as inspired by the Islamic State of Iraq and the Levant (ISIL).

== Perpetrator ==
The attacker was identified as Bertrand Nzohabonayo, age 20, a French citizen and former rap musician born in Burundi in 1994, he was known to the police for minor crimes but was not on any watchlist. The attacker had taken Bilal as his new name upon conversion to Islam, and had been posting Islamist material on his Facebook page, including a photograph of the black flag of the Islamic State.

In Burundi, police arrested the attacker's brother, a man with known Islamist sympathies and claimed that they had informed French authorities the previous year that both brothers should be regarded as suspect due to their extreme religious views.

== Motivation ==
The Financial Times described the attack, along with the vehicle-ramming attacks on 21 December in Dijon and 22 December in Nantes as "the first ISIS-linked attacks" in France. According to The Globe and Mail, the attack was "apparently inspired by a video" circulated by ISIL calling on French Muslims to attack non-Muslims using vehicles.

According to David C. Rapoport of the University of California, Los Angeles, these three attacks can be understood in the context of the rise of the Islamic State in Syria. "In September 2014, after the U.S. organized its airstrikes, the Islamic State’s chief spokesman called on Muslims in Western countries to find an infidel and ‘smash his head with a rock’, poison him, run him over with a car or ‘destroy his crops’. Two months later a video released in French contained virtually the same message and a series of strange 'lone wolf' attacks followed on three consecutive days, the perpetrators declaring “'God is Great' in Arabic. Three policemen were stabbed in Joué-lès-Tours, and vehicles were used to run over eleven pedestrians in Dijon and ten in Nantes."

== Aftermath ==
The attack was categorised as "religiously inspired terrorism" by Europol, as reported to them by France. Following this attack, the 2014 Dijon attack and 2014 Nantes attack, which were deemed to be unrelated, the French government heightened the nation's security.

== See also ==
- January 2016 Paris police station attack
- Stabbing as a terrorist tactic
