= Henrik Kacser =

Hungarian biochemist and geneticist

Henrik Kacser FRSE
- Born: 22 September 1918; Câmpina, Romania
- Died: 13 March 1995 (aged 76); Edinburgh
- Citizenship: UK
- Education: Queen's University of Belfast
- Known for: Metabolic control analysis
- Scientific career
- Fields: Systems Biology, Network Biology, Genetics
- Workplaces: University of Edinburgh

Henrik Kacser FRSE (22 September 1918 – 13 March 1995) was an Austro-Hungarian-born biochemist and geneticist who worked in Britain in the 20th century. Kacser's achievements have been recognised by his election to the Royal Society of Edinburgh in 1990, by an honorary doctorate of the University of Bordeaux II in 1993.

== Early life ==
Henrik Kacser was born in Câmpina, Romania, in 1918 to Olga and Soma Kacser, an engineer, both Austro-Hungarian. The family moved to Berlin, where Henrik went to the Tretscher School.

Before World War II, for educational reasons he moved to Belfast, Northern Ireland, where he did his undergraduate (BSc 1940, MSc 1942) and postgraduate work (PhD 1949) at the Queen's University of Belfast. There he studied chemistry, specialising in physical chemistry as a postgraduate student. He went to the University of Edinburgh in 1952 as a Nuffield Fellow under a scheme to introduce physical scientists into biology. This was to become the start of his work as a geneticist/biochemist. He earned the Diploma of Animal Genetics, and in 1955 he was appointed to the rank of Lecturer in the Department of Genetics at the University of Edinburgh.

== Areas of research ==
In most of his research his original training in physical chemistry is quite evident, as he focused mainly on the physical/chemical aspects of biology. Much of his early work includes work on practical chemistry, kinetics of enzyme reactions and very little on genetics. His work in this early period attracted little attention, with even the most highly cited paper having only 52 citations in 65 years. Between 1957 and 1973 he had only four publications, and it would have been easy to conclude that his career was over. However, that would have been completely wrong.

Kacser's work falls into four distinct categories: 1. building a foundation in physical chemistry; 2. development of metabolic control analysis; 3. consolidation and 4. expansion. Only in the third phase of his career his expertise in genetics came to light when he set out to find experimental models to demonstrate the correctness of his paper on metabolic control analysis.

=== The control of flux ===
Kacser's paper with Jim Burns, The control of flux, later thoroughly revised to take account of changes in terminology, was a landmark paper for both authors. It described how the rates of metabolic pathways were affected by changes in the amounts or activities of pathway enzymes (See Metabolic Control Analysis). They showed that the expectation that a metabolic pathway will be controlled by a single pacemaker reaction is a fallacy, and most of the experimental criteria used in the supposed identification of such steps are misleading. Instead, varying amounts of control can be distributed over the enzymes of the pathway, but this is a property of the metabolic system as a whole and cannot be predicted from the characteristics of the enzymes in isolation.

=== The molecular basis of dominance ===
The molecular basis of dominance (Kacser & Burns, 1981) is the companion paper to The control of flux and reveals the full meaning of its footnote "the implication of this for the problem of dominance and its evolution will be dealt with in a separate publication". The connection was that if the flux–enzyme relationship is quasi-hyperbolic, and if, for most enzymes, the wild-type diploid level of enzyme activity occurs where the curve is levelling out, then a heterozygote of the wild-type with a null mutant will have half the enzyme activity but will not exhibit a noticeably reduced flux. Therefore, the wild type appears dominant and the mutant recessive because of the system characteristics of a metabolic pathway.

== Influential publications ==
By the mid-1980s the central ideas of metabolic control analysis laid out in this paper were becoming far more widely accepted. Further experimental methods based on the theories laid out in the paper were used to help in the understanding of metabolic regulation and molecular evolution, and to show how metabolic control analysis could be applied to problems in medicine and biotechnology. The paper with Richard Beeby 1984 showed how the idea of evolution by natural selection could be applied in a constructive way to provide models for the evolution of enzyme catalysis.

Other papers include:

- Responses of metabolic systems to large changes in enzyme activities and effectors: 1. The linear treatment of unbranched chains (Small & Kacser, 1993a)
- Responses of metabolic systems to large changes in enzyme activities and effectors: 2. The linear treatment of branched chains (Small & Kacser, 1993b)
- A universal method for achieving increases in metabolite production (Kacser & Acerenza, 1993)
- Control analysis of time-dependent metabolic systems (Acerenza, Sauro & Kacser, 1989)

These papers, in collaboration with Rankin Small and Luis Acerenza, have shown that the prospects for achieving large increases in flux by changing the activity of a single enzyme are poor but a coordinated set of changes, designed by their "Universal Method" could make large changes without catastrophic perturbations of the rest of metabolism.

Biochemical interest in the ideas expressed in "The control of flux" started to grow in the 1980s, particularly with its experimental applications in Amsterdam to oxidative phosphorylation, urea synthesis and gluconeogenesis.

At this time, because the theory of Kacser and Burns and the simultaneous but independent work carried out by Reinhart Heinrich and Tom Rapoport in Berlin were compatible, a common terminology and set of symbols was agreed for the new field of Metabolic Control Analysis.

== Later life ==
On retiring from lecturing in 1988 he became a Fellow of the University of Edinburgh. Kacser was an active geneticist/biochemist right up until his death. At the time of his death, Henrik still ran an active laboratory, had two large grants supporting his work and continued to produce original scientific ideas.

He was elected to the Fellowship of The Royal Society of Edinburgh in 1990. His proposers were W. G. Hill, Alan Robertson, Charlotte Auerbach, Geoffrey Beale and Douglas Scott Falconer. In 1993 he received an honorary doctorate (DUniv) from the University of Bordeaux.

He died in Edinburgh on 13 March 1995.

== Family ==
Henrik married twice: firstly in 1947 to Beatrice McConkey (d. 1969); secondly in 1978 to Elaine Daffern.
