= Viehmann =

Viehmann is a surname. It is the surname of:

- Dorothea Viehmann (1755–1816), German storyteller
- Eva Viehmann (born 1980), German mathematician
- Franz Viehmann, German actor in Interrogating the Witnesses and Rising to the Bait
- George E. Viehmann, Jr., American newscaster for KABR (defunct)
