= 2014 Nantes attack =

Vehicle ramming attack in Nantes, France

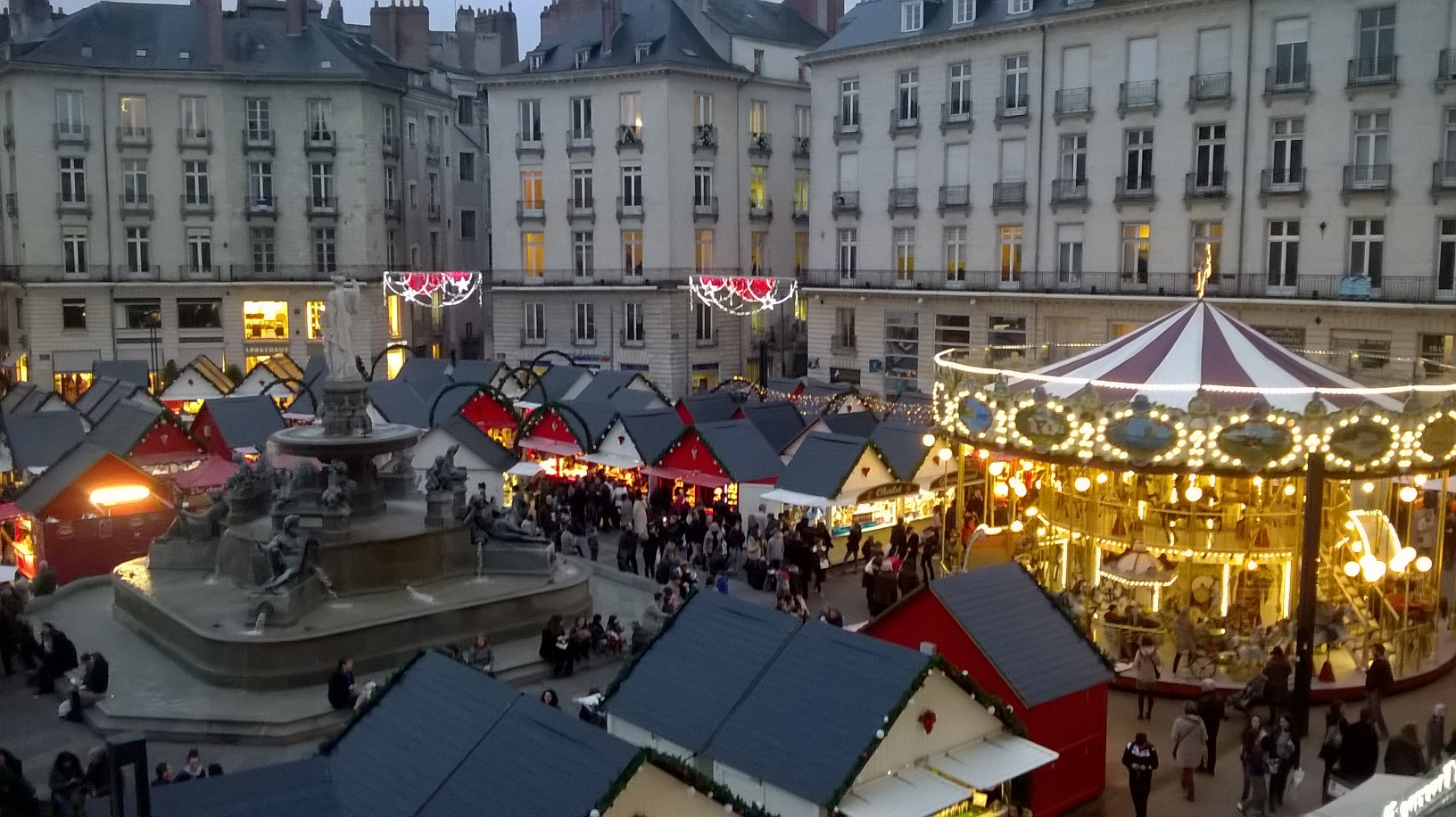
- The Place Royale Christmas market one year after the attack

- Location of Loire-Atlantique within France
- Location: Place Royale, Nantes, France
- Date: 22 December 2014
- Target: Civilians
- Attack type: Vehicular assault
- Weapon: White van
- Deaths: 1
- Injuries: 10 (including the suspect)
- Victim: Virgile Porcher
- Perpetrator: Sébastien Sarron
- Motive: Suspected mental unbalance

On 22 December 2014, Sébastien Sarron ran over ten pedestrians in his van at the Christmas market of the French city of Nantes, before attempting suicide by stabbing himself. Ten people, including the suspect, suffered non-fatal injuries. One man, Virgile Porcher, was pronounced dead the following day.

The attack came a day after a similar automotive attack on pedestrians in Dijon, as well as two days after a stabbing attack inside a police station in Joué-lès-Tours. Although the three attacks were treated as unrelated, the Government of France deployed 300 soldiers onto the nation's streets to heighten security afterwards.

In 2016, the Financial Times described this attack, the 21 December 2014 Dijon attack, and the 20 December 2014 Tours police station stabbing as "the first ISIS-linked attacks" in France.

== Suspect ==
French Interior Minister Bernard Cazeneuve said that the attacker in Nantes was "unbalanced". There were initial reports that the attacker had shouted Allahu Akbar ("God is Great"), however, police stated that a notebook in his van contained "incoherent suicidal phrases", and his fear of being murdered by the secret services. A test found 1.80 g of alcohol per litre of blood, four times the maximum legal rate.

The driver was Sébastien Sarron (38), a farmer from Berneuil near Saintes, Charente-Maritime. After tending his wounds, he was transferred to a psychiatric hospital on 31 December.

In January 2015 he was transferred to prison. He was described as a loner, an alcoholic and paranoiac, but was declared by a psychiatrist as responsible enough to be tried. He hanged himself in his isolation cell at the Nantes-Carquefou prison on the early morning of 13 April 2016.

== Motivation ==
The Financial Times described in a July 2016 piece this attack, the 21 December 2014 Dijon attack, and the 20 December 2014 Tours police station stabbing as "the first ISIS-linked attacks" in France. According to The Globe and Mail, the attack was "apparently inspired by a video" circulated by ISIL calling on French Muslims to attack non-Muslims using vehicles.

According to David C. Rapoport of the University of California, Los Angeles, these three attacks can be understood in the context of the rise of the Islamic State in Syria. "In September 2014, after the U.S. organized its airstrikes, the Islamic State’s chief spokesman called on Muslims in Western countries to find an infidel and ‘smash his head with a rock’, poison him, run him over with a car or ‘destroy his crops’. Two months later a video released in French contained virtually the same message, and a series of strange 'lone wolf' attacks followed on three consecutive days, the perpetrators declaring 'God is Great' in Arabic. Three policemen were stabbed in Joué-lès-Tours, and vehicles were used to run over eleven pedestrians in Dijon and ten in Nantes."

== Reaction ==
Interior Ministry spokesman Pierre-Henry Brandet announced an investigation into the Nantes attack, saying "I wouldn't say it was a terrorist attack. I would call it a deliberate act".

François Hollande, the President of France, ordered an emergency cabinet meeting as a result of the attack in Nantes.

Manuel Valls, the Prime Minister of France, aimed to reassure the French public that their concerns over the incidents would be listened to by the government.
