= John E. Hearst =

American chemist (1935–2022)

- Born: July 3, 1935; Vienna, Austria
- Died: October 25, 2022 (aged 87); Berkeley, California, U.S.
- Education: Yale University (B.E.); California Institute of Technology (Ph.D)
- Known for: DNA modeling
- Awards: Fellow AAAS, Guggenheim Fellow
- Scientific career
- Fields: Chemistry; Biology
- Workplaces: University of California Berkeley

John E. Hearst (July 3, 1935 – October 25, 2022) was an American-Austrian chemist in the fields of chemistry and molecular biology and a Professor Emeritus at University of California Berkeley. He is known for his scientific work in molecular biology, especially in DNA modeling.

== Biography ==
Hearst was born in Vienna, Austria on July 2, 1935, and immigrated to the United States as a small child to escape the Nazi regime. He completed his B.E. from Yale University in 1957 followed by a Ph.D. from the California Institute of Technology in 1961. His advisor was the well-known molecular biologist Prof. Jonathan Singer. He became a Miller Professor at Berkeley in 1970 followed by an illuminated career in science and scientific leadership, among other key appointments serving as the Senior Staff Scientist, Structural Biology Division, Lawrence Berkeley National Laboratory (1980–1999), and as the director of the Chemical Biodynamics Division, Lawrence Berkeley Laboratory for two terms (1986–1987, 1988–1989). He served as a president of the American Society for Photobiology (1991–1992).

In the 1970s he worked with his collaborated with his colleague Henry Rapport developing a photochemical method of inactivation of pathogens that became the basis for the work of HRI Research and HRI Associates and later the Cerus Corporation, which he co-founded in 1991. As founding director, he served on the board of directors for a decade (1991–2003). He continued on as vice president of new science opportunities until his retirement in 2004 when he transitioned into a consulting role.

He advised a number of graduate students during his career and led the Hearst Research Laboratory/group at Berkeley till his retirement. He has a high number of citations to his work (20,520) and an h-index of 74. He was also an author of a book on general chemistry.

Hearst was awarded an honorary degree of D.Sc. by Lehigh University in 1992. He was a fellow of the American Association for the Advancement of Science and a Guggenheim Fellow in 1968.

Hearst died on October 25, 2022, at the age of 87.
