= Ingeborg Rapoport =

German physician and East German communist functionary

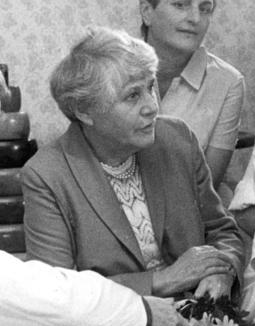
- Rapoport in 1985
- Born: Ingeborg Syllm; 2 September 1912; Kribi, German Cameroon
- Died: 23 March 2017 (aged 104)
- Education: Humboldt University of Berlin (Dr. phil. hab.); University of Hamburg (PhD); Woman's Medical College of Pennsylvania / Drexel University (MD)
- Occupations: Physician and professor in East Germany
- Known for: Oldest person to receive a Ph.D. (age of 102)
- Political party: Socialist Unity Party of Germany
- Spouse: Samuel Mitja Rapoport
- Children: 4, including Michael and Tom
- Awards: Patriotic Order of Merit, National Prize of East Germany and other East German awards

Ingeborg Rapoport (née Syllm; 2 September 1912 – 23 March 2017) was a German pediatrician who was a prominent figure in East German medicine and, at age 102, the oldest person to receive a doctorate degree.

Rapoport studied medicine in Hamburg in Nazi Germany, but was denied a medical degree because her mother was of Jewish ancestry. She fled Nazi persecution and emigrated to the United States in 1938, where she completed her education in medicine. In the early 1950s, as a result of an investigation of her and her husband for un-American activities, she left the United States and eventually, after staying in Vienna for a year, moved to the German Democratic Republic (East Germany). She became the first chair of neonatology in the whole of Germany and retired in 1973. She was a member of the Socialist Unity Party of Germany.

In East Germany, Rapoport received Habilitation in 1959. She was awarded the National Prize of East Germany and Honoured Doctor of the People as well as other awards and honorary titles. As a pediatrician, she helped to considerably reduce infant mortality in East Germany, which, during her active years was even lower than in West Germany.

In 2015, the Faculty of Medicine of Hamburg University corrected the injustice of the Nazi regime and awarded her a medical degree after an oral examination. She became the oldest person to receive a Doctorate degree at the age of 102.

== Early life ==
Ingeborg Syllm was born in 1912 to Protestant German parents Paul Friedrich Syllm and Maria Syllm in Kribi, in the then German colony of Kamerun, present-day Cameroon.

Shortly after her birth, the family moved to Hamburg, Germany, where she grew up with her parents. Both her parents were Protestant Christians, but her mother had Jewish ancestry.

She was raised as a Protestant. Her father was a businessman with conservative and German nationalist beliefs, and descended from the Sillem family, a prominent Protestant family from Hamburg, with Syllm being a variant spelling. Her parents divorced in 1928.

Ingeborg Syllm studied medicine at the University of Hamburg and passed the state examination as a physician in 1937. The following year she submitted her doctoral dissertation about diphtheria. Because she was categorized as a "Mischling" (i.e. someone with both Jewish and "Aryan" ancestry) by the Nazis, she was not permitted to defend her thesis and was denied the medical degree. Her thesis supervisor, Rudolf Degkwitz, attested that he would have accepted Rapoport's thesis "if it was not for the existing racial laws".

== Life in the United States ==
Rapoport immigrated to the United States in 1938. She interned in medical schools in Brooklyn, New York, Baltimore and Akron, Ohio. She completed her graduate education at the Woman's Medical College of Pennsylvania (absorbed by Drexel University) in Philadelphia and received an M.D.

Rapoport worked as a pediatrician at the Children's Hospital in Cincinnati, and went on to become the head of the outpatient department. She met her husband, Samuel Mitja Rapoport, in Cincinnati.

== House Un-American Activities Committee ==
Rapoport became politically engaged after witnessing the poverty of the black population in the US, but when the House Un-American Activities Committee launched an investigation of Rapoport and her husband for engaging in communist activities, they left the United States in 1950. They first went to Austria, but found it difficult to get employment there due to the influence of the CIA. While in Vienna, they looked for work in several west European countries including England, France, and Scandinavia who were reluctant to take communist immigrants seeking political asylum. Similar efforts in Israel also did not work out because the Rapoports were also avowed anti-Zionists.

== Life in East Germany ==
In 1952 Rapoport moved to East Germany, after her husband was offered the chair of Biochemistry of the Humboldt University in East Berlin.

In East Germany, Rapoport was co-founder of the Society of Perinatology of the GDR, council-member of the European Society of Perinatology, a member of the "committee for the reduction of infant mortality", and head of a national research project on perinatology. She was awarded a Habilitation in 1959 and was employed at the Humboldt University and Charité Hospital in Berlin.

She was the founder of the first clinic of neonatology in Germany and appointed as a professor of neonatology in 1969. She retired in 1973. She was a member of the Socialist Unity Party of Germany.

== Views on East Germany ==
After the fall of communism, Rapoport defended the GDR in several interviews.

Rapoport said that "East Germany was not a state of injustice" and denied that East Germany was an immoral state. She described the critical depiction of East Germany in German media and scholarship and inquiries into the crimes of the Stasi as "slander."

Also, Rapoport said that, despite its faults, East German society was superior with respect to its health system, social network, and education system to what she experienced in the Weimar Republic (Germany), United States, and currently in Germany. In particular, she praised the healthcare system of East Germany for guaranteeing everybody the same treatment, irrespective of social background or wealth. Rapoport claimed that even modern society can learn from East Germany and said that "I'm nostalgic for certain aspects of the GDR. Even with the mistakes it (East Germany) was an important experiment" and that East Germany was "the best society I have seen." She contends that "in the future, I think they will think about us quite differently from how they do now.

== Life in retirement and Doctorate ==
Ingeborg Rapoport continued to live in the former East Berlin as a retiree. In 2015, the Faculty of Medicine of Hamburg University corrected the injustice of Nazi Germany to deny Rapoport the defense of her doctoral thesis. First the dean of the faculty of medicine suggested an honorary doctorate, but Rapoport persisted in a full oral examination of her thesis written 77 years earlier including new research advances in the field. The examination was given at her home on her thesis about diphtheria. After the exam Dean Koch-Gromus told the press: "She was absolutely brilliant. Her specific knowledge about the latest developments in medicine were unbelievable." Rapoport received a "magna cum laude" the second best possible result for a doctoral thesis. She said that she did it not for herself, but for the many people who were also discriminated by the Nazis on racial grounds or suffered even more from crimes of the regime. In June 2015 she became the oldest person to receive a Doctorate.

== Personal life ==
She was married to Samuel Mitja Rapoport, whom she met in Cincinnati. They had four children. One of their sons, Tom Rapoport, was a professor at the East German Academy of Sciences and moved to the United States, where he is now Professor at Harvard Medical School and an HHMI investigator. Another son, Michael Rapoport, is a mathematician at the University of Bonn. Her eldest daughter, Susan Richter, is a pediatrician, now retired and her younger daughter, Lisa Lange, was a nurse.

She published a memoir in 1997. A biographical movie, titled "Die Rapoports - Unsere drei Leben" about Rapoport and her husband's lives was shot by Sissi Hüetlin and Britta Wauer. It was released in 2003. Widowed in 2004, she lived in Berlin. She died on 23 March 2017.
