= Maria Heep-Altiner =

German mathematician (b. 1959)

- Born: 29 December 1959 (age 66); Niederzeuzheim, Germany
- Education: University of Bonn
- Occupations: Mathematician, university lecturer

Maria Heep-Altiner (born 29 December 1959 in Niederzeuzheim) is a German mathematician, actuary and university lecturer.

== Life ==
After graduating from the Prince Johann Ludwig School in Hadamar in 1978, Heep-Altiner studied mathematics and economics at the University of Bonn. In 1989 she earned her doctorate in mathematics on the number theory topic "Period relations for $GL_2(f)$" under Günter Harder and Michael Rapoport.

She then worked as an actuary for Gerling, before she moved companies in 1994 to Allgemeine Versicherungs-AG. There she became the actuarial manager for property insurance. In 2006, she moved to Talanx, where she was responsible for setting up an internal holding model.

In 2008, Heep-Altiner returned to academia as a professor at the Institute of Insurance at Cologne university of applied sciences. There she is responsible for the area of finance in the insurance company.

She is a member of the German Actuarial Society executive board.

In addition, she has co-published various publications on various actuarial topics, in particular on the Solvency II Directive 2009.

== Publications ==
For the following books Heep-Altiner was the main author or significant part of the writing team:

- Heinen, Norbert (1995). Kollektive Personenversicherung in Europa (in German). Karlsruhe: Verlag Versicherungswirtschaft. ISBN 3-88487-493-4. OCLC 34396664.
- Altiner, Maria (2001). Versicherungsmathematische Anwendungen in der Praxis mit Schwerpunkt Kraftfahrt und Allgemeine Haftpflicht (in German). Karlsruhe: VVW. ISBN 978-3-88487-902-3. OCLC 76217924.
- Altiner, Maria (2011). Internes Holdingmodell nach Solvency II : - Schritt für Schritt zu einem internen Holdingmodell (in German). City: Verlag Versicherungswirtschaft. ISBN 978-3-89952-632-5. OCLC 851315430.
