= Stefan Schuster =

German biophysicist

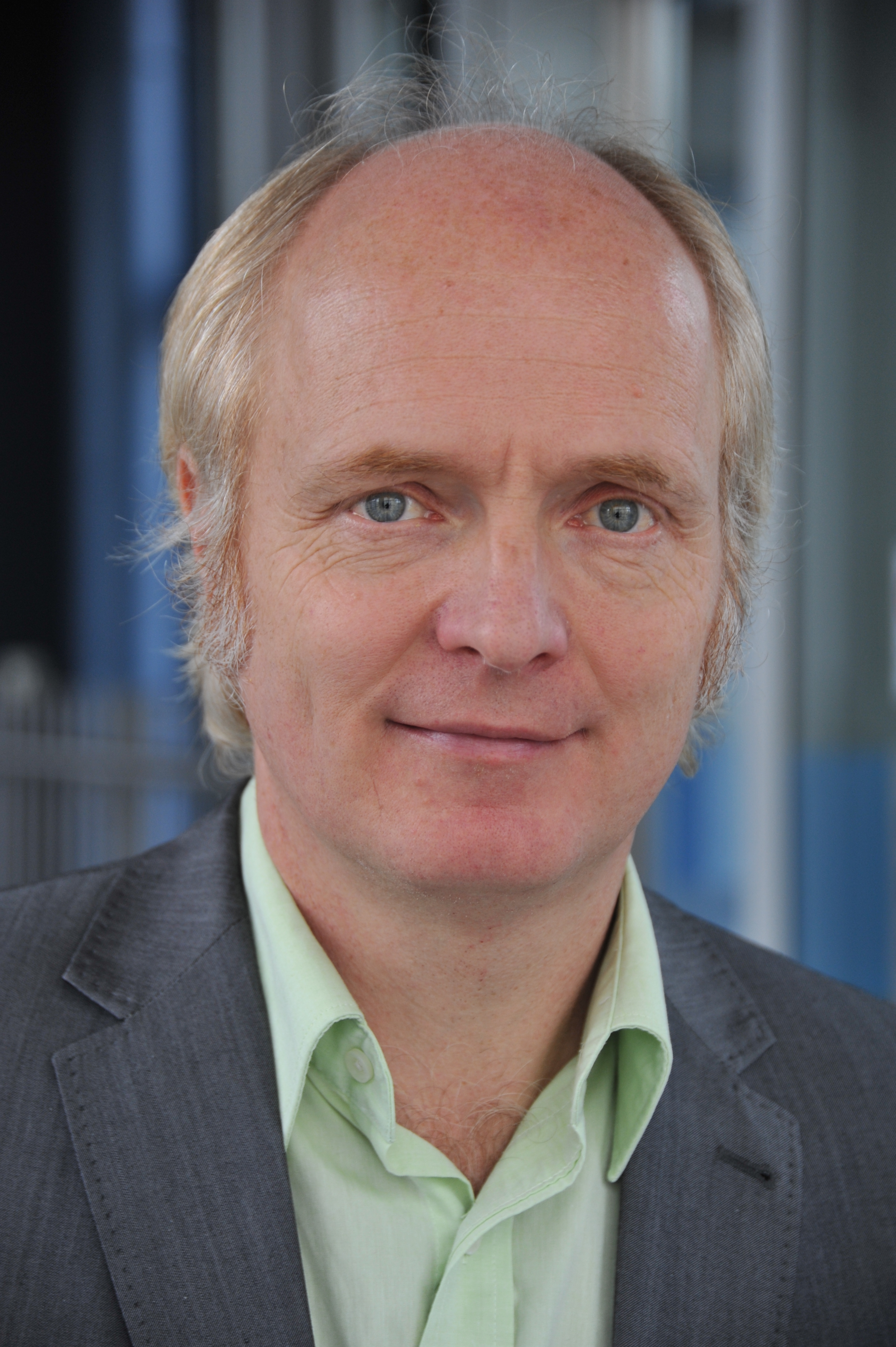
- Born: 7 November 1961 (age 64); Meissen, East Germany
- Education: Humboldt University of Berlin
- Known for: metabolism, signal transduction, metabolic control analysis, evolutionary game theory
- Relatives: Robert Schuster (brother)
- Scientific career
- Institutions: University of Jena
- Thesis: Theoretical studies on the interrelation between time hierarchy in enzymatic reaction systems and optimization principles
- Academic advisors: Reinhart Heinrich

Stefan Schuster (born 7 November 1961 in Meissen) is a German biophysicist. He is professor for bioinformatics at the University of Jena.

== Life ==
Stefan Schuster studied biophysics at the Humboldt University Berlin and wrote his PhD thesis under the supervision of Prof. Reinhart Heinrich at the Department of Theoretical Biophysics at Humboldt University, Berlin (Title: "Theoretical studies on the interrelation between time hierarchy in enzymatic reaction systems and optimization principles"). In 2003 he got a professorship at the Department of Bioinformatics at the Friedrich Schiller University, Jena.

Stefan Schuster is one of the spokesmen of the Jena Centre for Bioinformatics (JCB).

Stefan Schuster is currently editor of the Elsevier journal BioSystems.

His younger brother is the stage director Robert Schuster.

== Research ==
The research by Stefan Schuster comprises a wide range of topics in bioinformatics and systems biology. These include, among others:

- Evolutionary game theory
- Metabolic control analysis
- Biochemical oscillations
- Metabolic pathway analysis

Stefan Schuster has significantly contributed to the development of elementary mode analysis. That method has amply been used ever since for determining metabolic pathways and diverse applications in biotechnology such as calculating optimal molar yields. Schuster and his coworkers used the method, for example, for analyzing penicillin production and NAD^{+} metabolism as well as for predicting the viability of Escherichia coli mutants. He contributed to the development of software for metabolic pathway analysis.

An application of intense biochemical interest is the question whether humans and other higher animals could convert fatty acids into sugar. While biochemical textbook knowledge says that this would be infeasible, in silico analyses by Christoph Kaleta, Stefan Schuster and coworkers showed that there are, in principle, several entangled routes on which gluconeogenesis from fatty acid is feasible. This theoretical prediction found considerable attention in online articles.

Research on metabolic pathways includes flux balance analysis, which is used, for example, for explaining the Warburg effect.

The book of Reinhard Heinrich and Stefan Schuster "The Regulation of Cellular Systems" was reviewed by Athel Cornish-Bowden. He wrote: "For general readers, it would be a major advance if books like this one could help to overthrow the ideas of rate-limiting steps that have bedevilled the biochemical conception of metabolism for so long, preventing biotechnology from realizing many of the objectives that were promised when genetic engineering first became possible. For specialists already concerned with the kinetic behaviour of multi-enzyme systems, this is a book they need to have".
