= Robert Schuster =

German stage director and drama school teacher

Robert Schuster (born February 3, 1970, in Meißen) is a German stage director and drama school teacher.

Schuster studied cultural sciences at Humboldt University of Berlin and stage direction at the Ernst Busch Academy of Dramatic Arts in Berlin in the early 1990s. Together with his study mate Tom Kühnel, he later realized numerous theatre plays. In 1994, they directed “The Decision” (Die Maßnahme) by Bertolt Brecht at the ’’bat Theater’’, Berlin. For this, they were awarded the Austrian “Max Reinhardt Prize”. Shortly later, they directed “Christmas at Ivanov’s” (Weihnachten bei Iwanows) by Alexander Vvedensky at the Maxim Gorki Theatre, Berlin, for which they received the Friedrich Luft Prize of the city of Berlin.

In 2000, Robert Schuster started directing alone, both for the drama theatre and opera. His stage directions include:

- Titus Andronicus by William Shakespeare at the Schauspiel Frankfurt
- Emilia Galotti by Gotthold Ephraim Lessing at the Düsseldorfer Schauspielhaus
- The Bacchae by Euripides at the Theatre of Bremen
- Woyzeck by Georg Büchner at the Theatre of Bremen
- Mother Courage and Her Children by Bertolt Brecht at the Schauspiel Frankfurt
- An Enemy of the People by Henrik Ibsen at the Theatre of Bremen
- The Rats by Gerhart Hauptmann at the Theater Freiburg
- King Arthur (opera) by Henry Purcell at the Theater Freiburg
- Measure for Measure (in French) by Shakespeare at the National Theatre of Strasbourg (France)
- Danton's Death by Georg Büchner at the Theater Freiburg
- Servant of Two Masters by Carlo Goldoni at the Theater Freiburg
- Hamlet by William Shakespeare at the Deutsches Nationaltheater Weimar
- Rigoletto by Giuseppe Verdi at the Stadttheater Klagenfurt

Robert Schuster is a full professor in Stage Direction at the Ernst Busch Academy of Dramatic Arts in Berlin.

His elder brother is the biophysicist Stefan Schuster.
