= Sinaida Rosenthal =

German biochemist, geneticist and molecular biologist

- Born: Sinaida Gejelka; 22 February 1932; Berlin, Germany
- Died: 21 November 1988 (aged 56); Berlin, East Germany
- Education: Humboldt University, Berlin
- Occupations: University professor Biochemist; Molecular biologist
- Spouse: Hans-Alfred Rosenthal (1924-2009)
- Children: André Rosenthal and one other son
- Scientific career
- Fields: Biochemistry, molecular biology
- Thesis: 1960: Eiweißfreisetzung aus Rattenlebermitochondrien (Protein Release from Rat Liver Mitochondria), 1969: Über den Mechanismus des Ribosomenabbaus von Kaninchenretikulozyten (On the Mechanism of Ribosome break down in Rabbit Reticulocytes)

Sinaida Rosenthal (22 February 1932 – 21 November 1988) was a German biochemist and molecular biologist. She worked as a professor at the Humboldt University of Berlin and thereafter, until her death, as department head of the Central Institute for Microbiology at the Berlin based German Academy of Sciences.

== Life ==
Sinaida Gejelka was born in Berlin where, between 1950 and 1955, she studied medicine at the Humboldt University. Around this time she married the virologist Hans-Alfred Rosenthal. It was also at the Humboldt that she received her doctorate, in 1960, for a dissertation entitled "Protein Release from Rat Liver Mitochondria" ("Eiweißfreisetzung aus Rattenlebermitochondrien"), and later, in 1969, her habilitation (higher level qualification) for which she was supervised by Samuel Mitja Rapoport. On this occasion her dissertation was entitled "On the Mechanism of Ribosome break down in Rabbit Reticulocytes" (" Über den Mechanismus des Ribosomenabbaus von Kaninchenretikulozyten").

In 1969, still at the Humboldt, she was appointed professor for physiology and biology. In 1972 she switched to the Central Institute for Microbiology at the German Academy of Sciences in Buch, a district on the north-east of Berlin. She would remain here, in charge of the genetics department, till her death. She died as a result of cancer in 1988.

== Work and recognition ==
The focus of Rosenthal's research was on molecular biological and genetic aspects of physiology and on the application of genetic engineering.

In 1972 she became a corresponding member of the German Academy of Sciences at Berlin. Two years later she was accepted as a full member. From 1983 she was also a corresponding member of the East Germany Academy of Agri-sciences.
