= Marta Miączyńska =

Polish Professor of biological sciences

Marta Miączyńska is a Polish researcher in the field of molecular cell biology. A professor of biological sciences, she leads the Laboratory of Cell Biology at the International Institute of Molecular and Cell Biology in Warsaw (IIMCB). Since December 2018, she has been director of the IIMCB.

== Education and career ==
Miączyńska graduated in molecular biology from Jagiellonian University in 1992 and received her PhD in genetics from the University of Vienna in 1997. She was a postdoctoral fellow in the group of Marino Zerial at the European Molecular Biology Laboratory in Heidelberg (1998–2000) and at the Max Planck Institute of Molecular Cell Biology and Genetics in Dresden (2001–2004). After returning to Poland in 2005, she received her habilitation (the highest scientific degree in Poland) in 2008 and her professorial title in 2013.

== Research ==
Miączyńska's research focuses on molecular mechanisms integrating endocytic trafficking and intracellular signal transduction in health and disease. During her postdoctoral training, she discovered a distinct population of early endosomes in the cell, so called APPL endosomes. Together with her group at the IIMCB, she characterized novel functions of endocytic proteins in the regulation of signal transduction and transcription, as well as the role of endosomes as signaling platforms for receptors of growth factors and cytokines. Their current research reveals aberrations in intracellular transport in cancer cells that can serve to design new therapies in oncology. She has co-authored over 60 publications.

== Awards and memberships ==
Miączyńska has received fellowships from the Austrian Science Fund, the Human Frontier Science Program Organization, and L'Oreal Poland for Women and Science. She was a Wellcome Trust International Senior Fellow (2006–2012) and an International Scholar of the Howard Hughes Medical Institute (2006–2010). She led projects funded by the Polish-Swiss Research Program, the National Science Center, the Foundation for Polish Science, and the Max Planck Society. She served as a panelist for various funding agencies, including the European Research Council. In 2021, she received the Polish Prime Minister's Award for outstanding scientific achievements.

Miączyńska is an elected member of the Polish Academy of Sciences, the European Molecular Biology Organization (EMBO), and the Academia Europaea. She served as a member of the Council of the National Science Center (2016–2018). She is currently a member of EMBO Council and a member of the Board of Directors of the EU-LIFE, the alliance of research institutes advocating for excellent research in Europe, in which the IIMCB is the only Polish member. In January 2024, she was appointed Co-Chair of EU-LIFE, becoming Chair of EU-LIFE (2026-2027) on 1 January 2026.

Under her directorship, the IIMCB obtained an institutional grant for years 2023-2029, funded with 15 M EUR in the Teaming for Excellence programme under Horizon Europe for the project entitled "RNA and Cell Biology - from Fundamental Research to Therapies", acronym RACE. The project is conducted in collaboration with the Medical Research Council, Human Genetics Unit (MRC-HGU) at the University of Edinburgh and the Flanders Institute for Biotechnology (VIB). Marta Miączyńska is a leader of this project.
