= Cell biology =

Branch of biology that studies cells

Cell biology, cellular biology, or cytology, is the branch of biology that studies the structure, function, and behavior of the cells. All organisms are made of cells. A cell is the basic unit of life that is responsible for the living and functioning of an organism. Cell biology encompasses both prokaryotic and eukaryotic cells, with subtopics including the study of cell metabolism, cell communication, cell cycle, biochemistry, and cell composition.

The study of cells is performed using microscopy techniques, cell culture, and cell fractionation. These are used for research into how cells function, which ultimately gives insight into larger organisms. Knowing the components of cells and how cells work is fundamental to all biological sciences and is essential for research in biomedical fields such as cancer, and other diseases. Research in cell biology is interconnected to other fields such as genetics, molecular genetics, molecular biology, medical microbiology, immunology, and cytochemistry.

== History ==
Cells were first seen in 17th-century Europe with the invention of the compound microscope. In 1665, Robert Hooke referred to the building blocks of all living organisms as "cells" (published in Micrographia) after looking at a piece of cork and observing a structure reminiscent of monastic cells; however, the cells were dead. They gave no indication to the actual overall components of a cell. A few years later, in 1674, Anton Van Leeuwenhoek was the first to analyze live cells in his examination of algae. Many years later, in 1831, Robert Brown discovered the nucleus. All of this preceded the cell theory which states that all living things are made up of cells and that cells are organisms' functional and structural units. This was ultimately concluded by plant scientist Matthias Schleiden and animal scientist Theodor Schwann in 1838, who viewed live cells in plant and animal tissue, respectively. 19 years later, Rudolf Virchow further contributed to the cell theory, adding that all cells come from the division of pre-existing cells. Viruses are not considered in cell biology – they lack the characteristics of a living cell and instead are studied in the microbiology subclass of virology.

== Techniques ==
Cell biology research looks at different ways to culture and manipulate cells outside of a living body to further research in human anatomy and physiology, and to derive medications. The techniques by which cells are studied have evolved. Due to advancements in microscopy, techniques and technology have allowed scientists to hold a better understanding of the structure and function of cells. Many techniques commonly used to study cell biology are listed below:

- Cell culture: Utilizes rapidly growing cells on media which allows for a large amount of a specific cell type and an efficient way to study cells. Cell culture is one of the major tools used in cellular and molecular biology, providing excellent model systems for studying the normal physiology and biochemistry of cells (e.g., metabolic studies, aging), the effects of drugs and toxic compounds on the cells, and mutagenesis and carcinogenesis. It is also used in drug screening and development, and large scale manufacturing of biological compounds (e.g., vaccines, therapeutic proteins).
- Fluorescence microscopy: Fluorescent markers such as GFP, are used to label a specific component of the cell. Afterwards, a certain light wavelength is used to excite the fluorescent marker which can then be visualized.
- Phase-contrast microscopy: Uses the optical aspect of light to represent the solid, liquid, and gas-phase changes as brightness differences.
- Confocal microscopy: Combines fluorescence microscopy with imaging by focusing light and snap shooting instances to form a 3D image.
- Transmission electron microscopy: Involves metal staining and the passing of electrons through the cells, which will be deflected upon interaction with metal. This ultimately forms an image of the components being studied.
- Cytometry: The cells are placed in the machine which uses a beam to scatter the cells based on different aspects and can therefore separate them based on size and content. Cells may also be tagged with GFP-fluorescence and can be separated that way as well.
- Cell fractionation: This process requires breaking up the cell using high temperature or sonification followed by centrifugation to separate the parts of the cell allowing for them to be studied separately.

== Pathology ==
The scientific branch that studies and diagnoses diseases on the cellular level is called cytopathology. Cytopathology is generally used on samples of free cells or tissue fragments, in contrast to the pathology branch of histopathology, which studies whole tissues. Cytopathology is commonly used to investigate diseases involving a wide range of body sites, often to aid in the diagnosis of cancer but also in the diagnosis of some infectious diseases and other inflammatory conditions. For example, a common application of cytopathology is the Pap smear, a screening test used to detect cervical cancer, and precancerous cervical lesions that may lead to cervical cancer.

== Cell biologists ==
=== 17th century ===
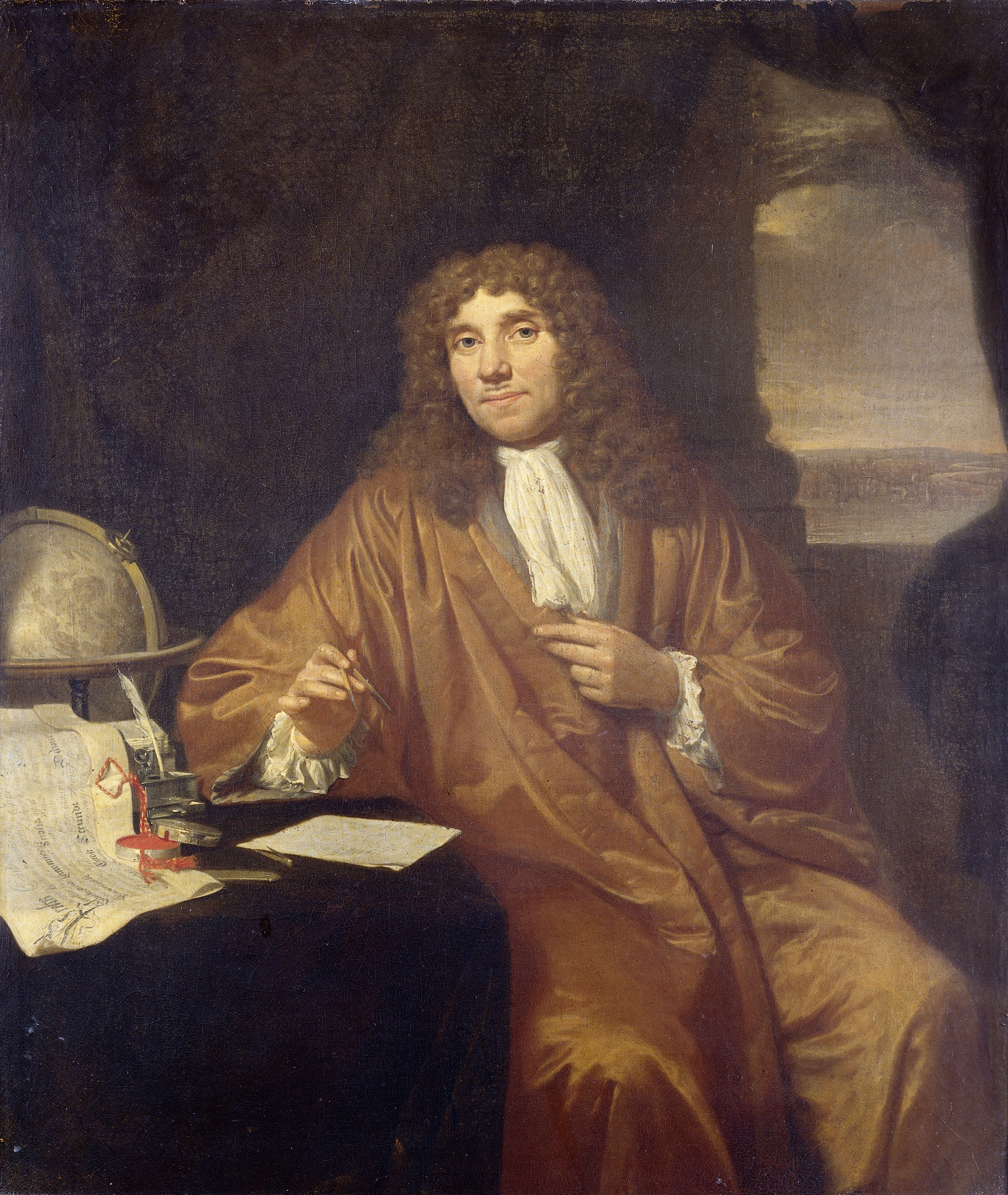
Anthonie van Leeuwenhoek, pioneer of cell microscopy

- Robert Hooke
- Anton van Leeuwenhoek

=== 19th century ===
- Jean Baptiste Carnoy
- Robert Brown
- Henri Dutrochet
- Jan Evangelista Purkyně
- Matthias Jakob Schleiden
- Theodor Schwann
- Rudolf Virchow

=== Modern ===
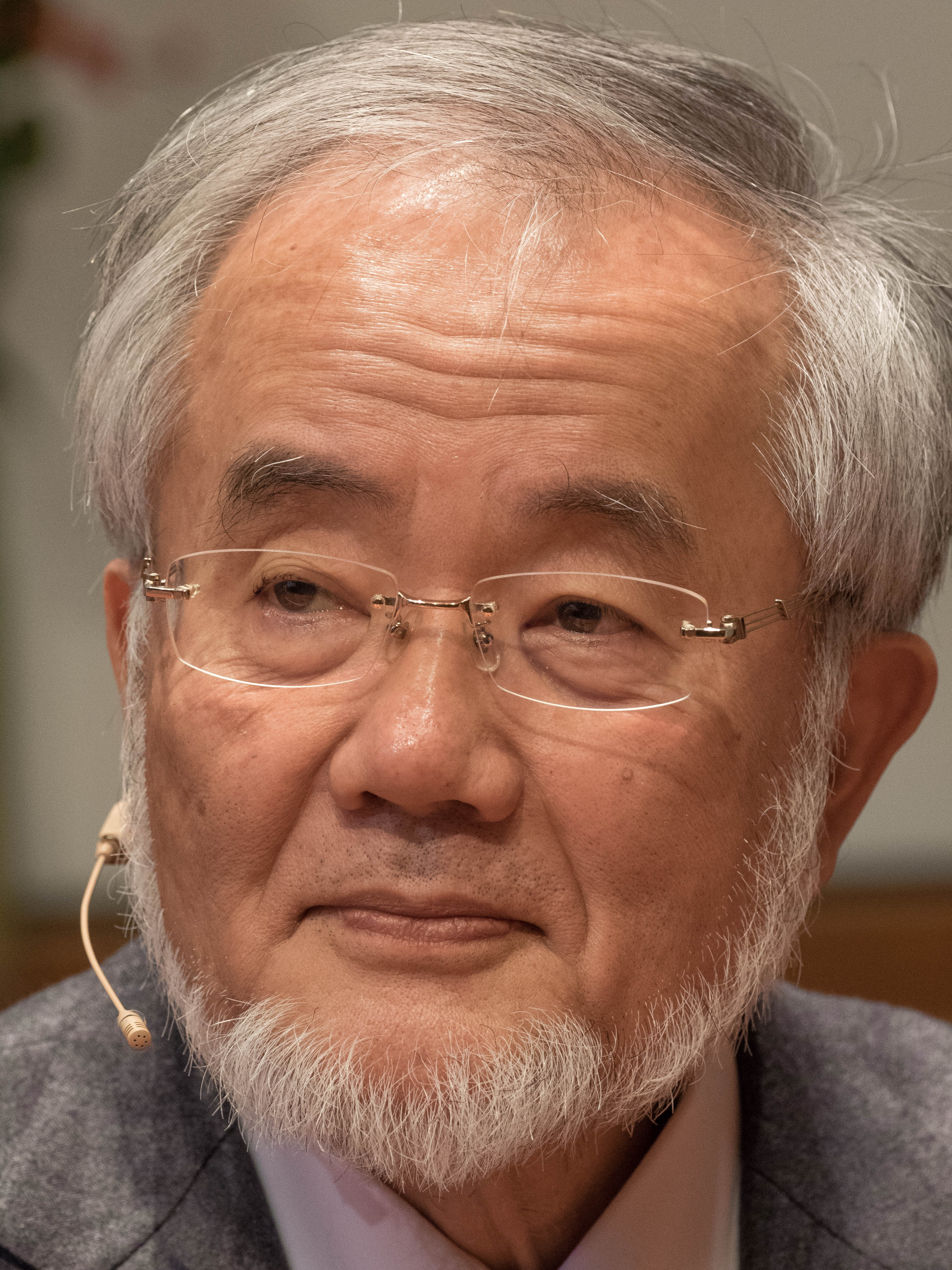
Yoshinori Ohsumi, Nobel Prize winner for work on autophagy

- Peter Agre
- Günter Blobel
- Geoffrey M. Cooper
- Christian de Duve
- H. Robert Horvitz
- Marc Kirschner
- Ira Mellman
- Marta Miączyńska
- Kenneth R. Miller
- Peter D. Mitchell
- Paul Nurse
- Yoshinori Ohsumi
- George Emil Palade
- Keith R. Porter
- Ray Rappaport
- Michael Swann
- Roger Tsien
- Edmund Beecher Wilson

== See also ==
- The American Society for Cell Biology
- Cell ablation
- Cell biophysics
- Cell physiology
- Cellular microbiology
- Clonogenic assay
- Outline of cell biology
