= Henry Rapoport =

American organic chemist

- Rapoport in 1985
- Born: November 16, 1918; Brooklyn, New York
- Died: March 6, 2002 (aged 83); Berkeley, California
- Occupation: Professor of Chemistry
- Spouse: Sonya Rapoport

Henry Rapoport (November 16, 1918 – March 6, 2002) was an internationally renowned organic chemist and Professor of Chemistry at the University of California, Berkeley. He is widely recognized for his work in the development of the chemical synthesis of biologically important compounds and pharmaceuticals.

Henry Rapoport obtained a B.S. in chemistry in 1940, an M.S. in chemistry in 1941, and a Ph.D. in organic chemistry in 1943, each from the Massachusetts Institute of Technology. He then worked at Heyden Chemical Corporation and the National Institutes of Health for several years. In 1946, he became a professor at UC Berkeley where he remained for the rest of his career. In 1989, he retired but continued his research as professor emeritus until his death from pneumonia in 2002.

He was particularly noted for the total synthesis of heterocyclic drugs and natural products, including porphyrins, camptothecin, saxitoxin, psoralens, antibiotics, antitumor compounds, and opium alkaloids such as morphine, codeine, and hydromorphone. His research led to the publication over 400 papers and 33 patents. His discoveries were the scientific foundation for numerous companies that Rapoport helped to start including HRI Research, HRI Associates, Advanced Genetics Research Institute, Cerus Corporation, ChemQuip, and Oncologic.

In his honor, UC Berkeley has established the Henry Rapoport Endowed Chair in Organic Chemistry, currently held by John F. Hartwig.

Daniel E. Levy dedicated his book Arrow Pushing in Organic Chemistry: An Easy Approach to Understanding Reaction Mechanisms to Henry Rapoport.

== Major awards ==
1955 Guggenheim Fellowship
1966- 1967 Miller Research Professorship, University of California Berkeley

1972 Research Achievement Award in Pharmaceutical and Medicinal Chemistry from the Academy of Pharmaceutical Sciences
1985 Arthur C. Cope Scholar Award from the American Chemical Society
1988 Ernest Guenther Award in the Chemistry of Natural Products from the American Chemical Society
1989 Distinguished Hope Scholar Award from Hope College
1992 Research Achievement Award from the American Society of Pharmacognosy
1997 Berkeley Citation from the University of California
