= Avner Ash =

American mathematician

Avner Ash is a professor of mathematics at Boston College. Prior to that, he held faculty positions at Columbia University and Ohio State University.

Ash received his Ph.D. from Harvard University in 1975 under the supervision of David Mumford.

In 2012, Ash became a fellow of the American Mathematical Society.

== Works ==
- Ash, Avner; Gross, Robert (2006). Fearless Symmetry: Exposing the Hidden Patterns of Numbers. Princeton University Press. ISBN 0691124922.
- Ash, Avner; Gross, Robert (2008). ebook. Princeton University Press. ISBN 978-1-400-83777-9.
- Ash, Avner; Mumford, David; Rapoport, Michael; Tai, Yung Sheng (2010). Smooth Compactifications of Locally Symmetric Varieties. Cambridge University Press. ISBN 978-0-521-73955-9.
- Ash, Avner; Gross, Robert (2012). Elliptic Tales: Curves, Counting, and Number Theory. Princeton University Press. ISBN 978-1-400-84171-4.
- Ash, Avner; Gross, Robert (2016). Summing It Up: From One Plus One to Modern Number Theory. Princeton University Press. ISBN 978-1-400-88053-9.
