= Reinhart Heinrich =

German biophysicist

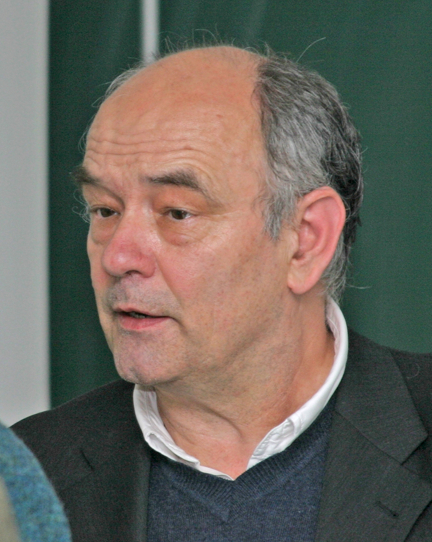
- Born: 24 April 1946; Dresden, Germany
- Died: 23 October 2006 (aged 60); Berlin, Germany
- Education: Dresden University of Technology
- Known for: Metabolism, signal transduction, The Regulation of Cellular Systems
- Awards: Humboldt Prize, Brigitte Reimann Prize, Honorary doctorate from the University of Bordeaux
- Scientific career
- Fields: Systems biology, biophysics
- Workplaces: Charité, Berlin; Humboldt University of Berlin; Charité

Reinhart Heinrich (24 April 1946 – 23 October 2006) was a German biophysicist.

He was professor at the Humboldt University of Berlin, and best known as one of the founders, with Tom Rapoport, of metabolic control theory in parallel with similar ideas developed at about the same time by Henrik Kacser and Jim Burns. His far-reaching theoretical work on metabolism, signal transduction, and other cellular processes has made him one of the most influential forerunners of present-day systems biology. Reinhart's many talents made him appear as a modern Renaissance man. He played the violin, and published an autobiographic novel (Jenseits von Babel) and several works of lyric poetry for which he received the Brigitte Reimann Prize. Among his services to the scientific community, Reinhart was associate editor of PLoS Computational Biology.

Reinhart Heinrich was born in Dresden and lived at first in the Soviet Union, growing up in Kuybyshev/Куйбышев (called Samara since 1991) where his father Helmut Heinrich — a German mathematician turned aircraft constructor — had been taken after the Second World War to work. Having been educated as a theoretical physicist at Dresden University of Technology in East Germany, Reinhart conducted his postdoctoral research in the early 1970s at the Charité's Institute of Biochemistry in East Berlin. He could not fail to notice the absence of mathematical theory from cell biology as compared with other natural sciences. Enzyme kinetics was a notable exception. However, how enzymes affect the flux through a metabolic pathway was still discussed using the rather vague term rate-limiting step. Working with Tom Rapoport on mathematical models of glycolysis in red blood cells, Reinhart discovered a precise and general definition of rate limitation in metabolic pathways, for which he received in 1974 the Humboldt Prize. He extended his knowledge in this area, working over one year in Pushchino with Evgeni Selkov, who also worked on mathematical modelling of metabolic processes.

The parallel development of metabolic control theory by Henrik Kacser and Jim Burns in Edinburgh shows that the time was ripe for a quantitative understanding of metabolic regulation. Instead of postulating a single rate-limiting step, these theories evaluated the degree of flux control exerted by an individual enzyme in a linear pathway or in a more complex network. The corresponding measure, now called the flux control coefficient by general agreement, turned out to be a truly systemic quantity, depending not only on the kinetic parameters of the enzyme itself but also on those of other enzymes, as well as on the position of the reaction in the network. After a slow start metabolic control theory has become more widely known by biochemists. Control coefficients have been measured for many pathways, confirming the theoretical prediction that flux control is frequently shared by several reactions. This finding has become of practical importance for the genetic engineering of large metabolic networks in biotechnology.

The dual approach — modelling concrete cellular processes and, at the same time, searching for general laws — has been a characteristic of Reinhart's work.

Perhaps the questions that interested him the most were those of evolution. To understand the kinetic design of enzymes and enzymatic reaction networks, Reinhart strove to rationalize, in mathematical terms, the selective pressures and physico–chemical constraints that these systems were subjected to. Reinhart's work on this topic is full of original insight and makes specific predictions, some of which have begun to be tested successfully in recent years.

Reinhart was author of more than 160 research articles and, together with Stefan Schuster, the book The Regulation of Cellular Systems, which has become a highly-esteemed text of cell systems biology. In addition to this large body of original work, he was a mentor of young scientists and for more than ten years ran the successful interdisciplinary graduate program Dynamics and Evolution of Cellular Processes at Humboldt University, Berlin. In 1996 he received an Honorary degree from the University of Bordeaux.
