= Eva Viehmann =

German mathematician

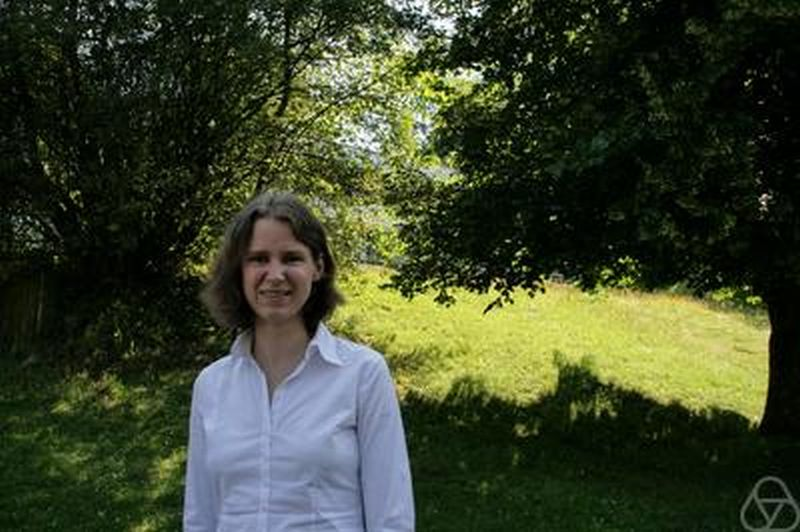
- Viehmann in Oberwolfach, 2012
- Born: 1980 (age 45–46)
- Education: University of Bonn
- Occupations: Mathematician, university professor
- Awards: Leibniz Prize (2024)

Eva Viehmann (born 1980) is a German mathematician who holds a professorial chair in the arithmetic geometry and representation theory research group at the University of Münster. Before that she was a professor working on arithmetic geometry at the Technical University of Munich.

Viehmann studied at the University of Bonn, where her 2005 doctoral thesis, On affine Deligne-Lusztig varieties for $\operatorname{GL}_n$ (supervised by Michael Rapoport) won the Felix Hausdorff Memorial Award. She earned her habilitation in 2010, and in 2012 was appointed to her professorship at the Technical University of Munich.

Viehmann won the 2012 von Kaven Award in mathematics of the Deutsche Forschungsgemeinschaft for her work on the Langlands program. She was an invited speaker at the 2018 International Congress of Mathematicians, speaking in the section on Lie Theory and Generalizations. She was also the Emmy Noether Lecturer of the German Mathematical Society in 2018. In 2021 she became a member of the German Academy of Sciences Leopoldina.
