= Rudolf Degkwitz =

German physician and member of the Nazi Party

- Born: 19 January 1889
- Died: 21 May 1973 (aged 84)
- Occupation: Physician
- Political party: Nazi Party

Rudolf Degkwitz (19 January 1889, in Ronneburg – 21 May 1973, in Emmendingen) was a German physician, an early member of the Nazi Party and a participant in the 1923 Beer Hall Putsch.

He was acquainted with Rudolf Hess and became involved with the Nazi Party in the early 1920s. He took part in Nazi political discussions in Munich and befriended Adolf Hitler. In 1923 he became a member of the Nazi Party, and he took part in the Beer Hall Putsch in November 1923. He eventually left the Nazi Party, but unsuccessfully applied in 1933 and 1937 to become a member again. He signed the Loyalty Oath of German Professors to Adolf Hitler and the National Socialist State in 1933.

Degkwitz was a professor at the University of Greifswald from 1925, and at the University of Hamburg from 1932. He eventually became critical of some aspects of Nazism, especially child euthanasia in Nazi Germany. In 1944, Degkwitz was convicted by the People's Court of subversion of national defense and sentenced to seven years imprisonment. The court, however, lauded his medical work, and therefore did not sentence him to death.

After the war, Degkwitz briefly resumed his medical work in Germany, but after a conflict with his employer he emigrated to the United States and worked in the private sector. He moved back to Germany shortly before his death in 1973. In the 30's he wrote his Treatise on Pediatrics assisted by doctors A. Eckstein, E. Freudenmberg, H. Brühl, F. Goebel where he shows in his chapters that he was an expert in pediatric infections (1).
