= Michael Rapoport =

Austrian mathematician (born 1948)

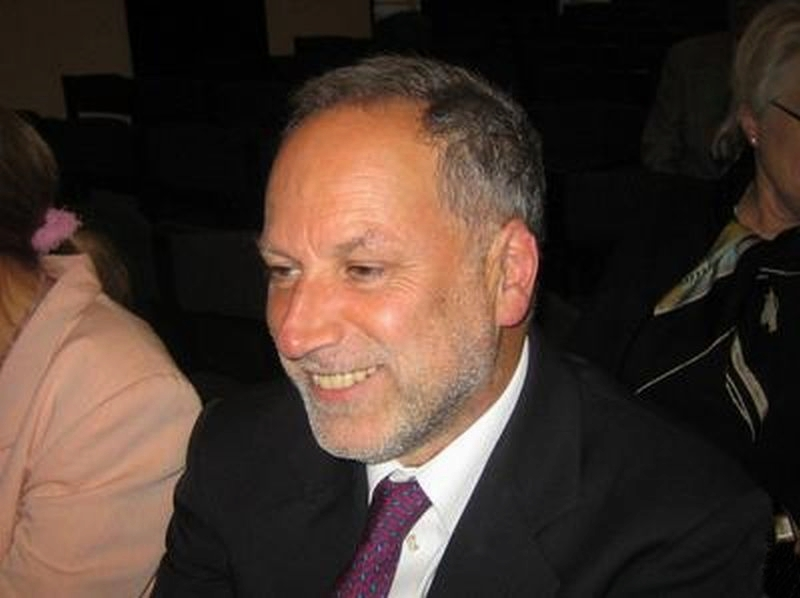
- Rapoport in 2007
- Born: 2 October 1948 (age 78); Cincinnati, Ohio
- Education: Paris-Sud 11 University
- Known for: Works on Shimura varieties and Langlands program
- Awards: Leibniz Prize (1992); Heinz Hopf Prize (2011)
- Scientific career
- Fields: Mathematics
- Workplaces: University of Bonn
- Doctoral advisor: Pierre Deligne
- Doctoral students: Peter Scholze; Eva Viehmann; Maria Heep-Altiner

Michael Rapoport (born 2 October 1948) is an Austrian mathematician.

== Career ==
Rapoport received his PhD from Paris-Sud 11 University in 1976, under the supervision of Pierre Deligne. He held a chair for arithmetic algebraic geometry at the University of Bonn, as well as a visiting appointment at the University of Maryland. In 1992, he was awarded the Gottfried Wilhelm Leibniz Prize, in 1999 he won the Gay-Lussac Humboldt Prize, and he is the recipient of the 2011 Heinz Hopf Prize. In 1994, he was an Invited Speaker (with talk Non-Archimedean period domains) at the ICM in Zürich.

Rapoport's students include Maria Heep-Altiner, Werner Baer, Peter Scholze, Eva Viehmann, Lisa Sauermann.

== Personal life ==
Michael Rapoport is the son of pediatrician Ingeborg Rapoport and biochemist Samuel Mitja Rapoport, and brother of biochemist Tom Rapoport.

== Selected publications ==
- Deligne, P.; Rapoport, M. (1973). "Les Schémas de Modules de Courbes Elliptiques" (PDF). Lecture Notes in Mathematics. Berlin, Heidelberg: Springer Berlin Heidelberg. doi:10.1007/978-3-540-37855-6_4. ISBN 978-3-540-06558-6. ISSN 0075-8434.
- Ash, Avner; Mumford, David; Rapoport, Michael; Tai, Yung-sheng (2009). Smooth Compactifications of Locally Symmetric Varieties (PDF). Cambridge: Cambridge University Press. doi:10.1017/cbo9780511674693. ISBN 978-0-511-67469-3.
- Rapoport, M.; Zink, Th. (1982). "Über die lokale Zetafunktion von Shimuravarietäten. Monodromiefiltration und verschwindende Zyklen in ungleicher Charakteristik". Inventiones Mathematicae (in German). 68 (1). Springer Science and Business Media LLC: 21–101. Bibcode:1982InMat..68...21R. doi:10.1007/bf01394268. ISSN 0020-9910. S2CID 118533956.
- Laumon, G.; Rapoport, M.; Stuhler, U. (1993). "D-elliptic sheaves and the Langlands correspondence". Inventiones Mathematicae. 113 (1). Springer Science and Business Media LLC: 217–338. Bibcode:1993InMat.113..217L. doi:10.1007/bf01244308. ISSN 0020-9910. S2CID 124557672.
- Rapoport, Michael (1995). "Non-Archimedian [sic] Period Domains" (PDF). Proceedings of the International Congress of Mathematicians. Basel: Birkhäuser Basel. pp. 423–434. doi:10.1007/978-3-0348-9078-6_35. ISBN 978-3-0348-9897-3.
- with M. Richartz: On the classification and specialization of F-isocrystals with additional structure. In: Composito Mathematica 103(1996), no. 2, pp. 153–182. MR 1411570
- Rapoport, M (1996). Period spaces for p-divisible groups (PDF). Princeton, N.J: Princeton University Press. ISBN 978-0-691-02782-1. OCLC 945632434.
- Kudla, Stephen (2006). Modular forms and special cycles on Shimura curves (PDF). Princeton: Princeton University Press. ISBN 0-691-12551-1. OCLC 803434031.
- Kudla, Stephen; Rapoport, Michael (25 November 2010). "Special cycles on unitary Shimura varieties I. Unramified local theory". Inventiones Mathematicae. 184 (3). Springer Science and Business Media LLC: 629–682. arXiv:0804.0600. doi:10.1007/s00222-010-0298-z. ISSN 0020-9910. S2CID 15824793.

== See also ==
- Ahmed Abbes
- Yves André
- Ellen Baake
- Isaak Bacharach
