= Cerus Corporation =

US-based reduced-pathogen blood biotechnology company

- Traded as: Nasdaq: CERS
- Industry: Biotechnology
- Founded: September 1991; 34 years ago as Cerus Technologies Inc
- Headquarters: Concord, California, United States
- Key people: President and CEO William 'Obi' M. Greenman
- Products: Blood transfusion products
- Revenue: ▲$74.649 million (2019)
- Number of employees: 254 (2019)
- Website: www.cerus.com

Cerus Corporation is an American multinational biotechnology company headquartered in Concord, California that develops and provides a treatment system to pathogen-reduce human blood products for the healthcare industry.

== History ==
In the mid-1980s, hematologist Laurence Corash developed a novel method of inactivating HIV particles contained in donated blood plasma using ultraviolet lights. He continued building prototypes with help from colleagues at the UC-San Francisco School of Medicine, and together with chemist John E. Hearst founded the company as Cerus Technologies Inc. on September 19, 1991, later to be renamed as Cerus Corporation in its initial 1996 SEC filing.

== Products ==
The company's proprietary technology (called Helinx) was conceived by Corash in the mid-1980s as a method to protect patients from HIV-tainted plasma and platelet donations in the growing AIDS epidemic. These two blood components were found to be suitable to treat in ex-vivo isolation with the company's UV-A light process due to their naturally translucent properties. The UV exposure process works by intentionally damaging DNA and RNA material in foreign virus and bacteria that might be present, while remaining harmless to the donated blood plasma and platelets (which contains no RNA or DNA).

In December 2001, the Helinx process was incorporated into a medical device called Intercept Platelet blood screening system, and Cerus entered an agreement with Baxter International Inc to jointly commercialize the device in the European Union healthcare market and gain regulatory approvals. In 2006, Cerus announced they had acquired all of Baxter's shared commercial rights to the Intercept blood system for plasma and platelets, and also revealed that they were working on expanding their system to treat red blood cells (which are more opaque and harder to treat). Cerus later entered into another commercialization agreement with Grifols S.A. to market and operate their products in blood centers in Spain and Portugal.

== Regulatory approvals ==
The Intercept Blood System for Platelets received EU CE MARK Class III certification in 2002, and US FDA pre-market approval on December 18, 2014. On March 10, 2016, the FDA granted an expanded modification on the existing approval to also treat platelets suspended in 100% plasma. In 2005 the platelet CE MARK was re-approved with a modification to extend platelet storage to seven days (previously five days).

The Intercept Blood System for Plasma received EU CE MARK certification on November 21, 2006, and US FDA pre-market approval on December 16, 2014. Cerus also received certification under ISO 13485 for their blood plasma and platelet products in 2006.

On August 23, 2020, Cerus received US FDA Emergency Use Authorization to treat the donated convalescent plasma from recovered COVID-19 patients, with the purpose of giving investigative antibody immunotherapy transfusions to other COVID-19 patients suffering an infection.

== Effectiveness ==
The product's primary purpose is to guarantee a clean supply of blood products, and deactivate both known and unknown pathogens with minimal added effort. The Helinx technology and INTERCEPT system have been shown effective on several types of viruses, but it is not universally effective due to some kinds of pathogens' RNA or DNA being more resilient to the process (such as hepatitis A, human parvovirus 19 and some bacterial spores). Studies have shown the system to be effective at neutralizing HIV, hepatitis B, hepatitis C, West Nile virus, SARS-1 COV, MERS CoV, Zika, dengue fever, and SARS-CoV-19. It is also touted as being able to render certain bacteria unable to replicate.

In addition to pathogen neutralization, there are clinical trials in West Africa to test the effectiveness of using the INTERCEPT system to treat convalescent plasma from Ebola survivors, and administering the treated plasma to other patients still fighting an infection. Convalescent treatments using INTERCEPT are also being applied to Ebola survivor plasma donations at Emory University, and platelet donations in Puerto Rico, which has dengue fever and chikungunya infections in their population. Similarly, the US FDA has granted emergency use of INTERCEPT to sterilize convalescent COVID-19 patient plasma, although the US medical community harbors some disagreements on whether this approach will provide effective relief for its patients.

== Market reception ==
The Intercept systems are in use in multiple EU healthcare settings. However, the US market had not gained traction among blood centers, due to its added costs on top of an ample domestic supply of pre-screened clean blood, plasma and platelet units. In developing countries with lower levels of health care access, the product is finding greater clinical and humanitarian trial opportunities due to high rates of collecting and using unsafe donated whole blood, low access to plasma and platelet separating equipment, and low supply of screening tests.

In 2016 during the height of the Zika virus spread, Cerus' technology was supplied to a designated blood center in Rio de Janeiro, Brazil for use in ensuring a clean blood supply for competing athletes in the 2016 Rio Olympic Games.
