= Ray Rappaport =

American cell biologist

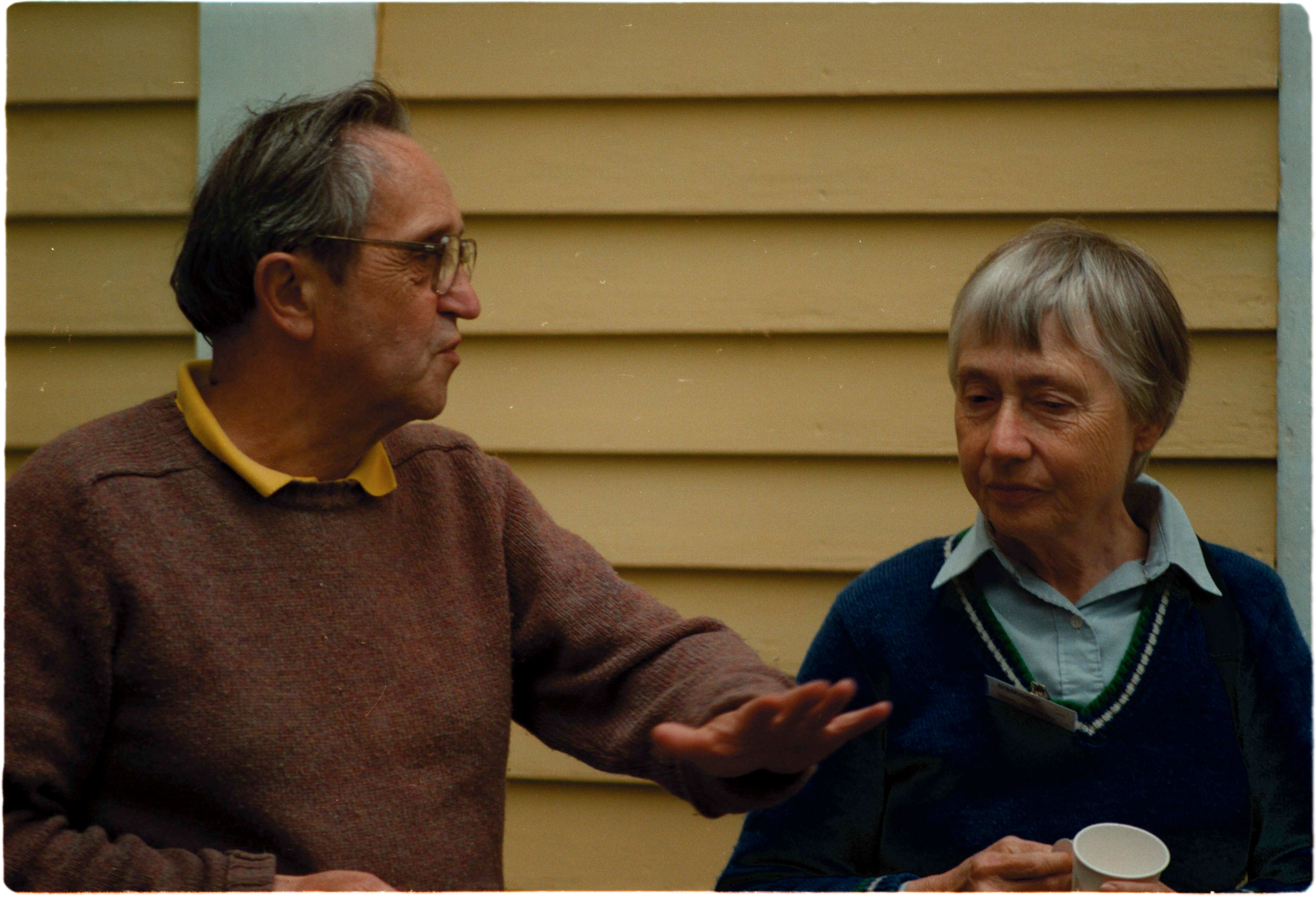
Ray and Barbara Rappaport in 1989

Ray Rappaport (May 21, 1922 – December 14, 2010) was an American cell biologist. He did pioneering research using physical manipulations of cells to understand the mechanisms of cytokinesis, the process by which a cell's cytoplasm is divided in two.

Raymond Rappaport was born in May 1922 in North Bergen, New Jersey, to Raymond and Verna Karper Rappaport. He attended Bethany College (West Virginia). His studies were interrupted by service during World War II in the 5th Service Command, Anti-Aircraft and then in the Army Medical Corps. He finished his undergraduate work at Columbia University, and enrolled in a masters program in Zoology at the University of Michigan. In a soil microbiology course, he met fellow masters student Barbara Nolan, and the two were wed in 1947. He earned his master's degree in 1948, and a PhD from Yale University in 1952.

Rappaport began his career as a professor at Union College in Schenectady, New York in 1952. He taught for 35 years and conducted research at the college and for most summers at MDI Biological Laboratory in Salisbury Cove, Maine. Rappaport held several administrative positions at the MDI Biological Laboratory, including director (1956–1959), trustee, and president of the corporation (1979–1981). Rappaport also architecturally designed some of the buildings at the laboratory, including several cottages, laboratory buildings, and the dining hall. He and his wife retired to Maine in 1987, where he continued research year-round at MDIBL.

Most of Rappaport's research made use of echinoderm embryonic cells to address the mechanisms of cytokinesis in animal cells, experiments that focused on understanding how the cytokinetic furrow is positioned, and understanding the nature of the stimulus from the mitotic spindle that induced cortical furrowing. With few exceptions, his research was conducted alone or with his wife. Rappaport's research was marked by unusually creative and simple experimental design, often involving physical manipulation of individual cells, for which he devised a number of custom microsurgical tools. Rappaport recognized mechanistic redundancy in cytokinesis, which he characterized in an address at a 2004 conference with, "When I began working on cytokinesis, I thought I was tinkering with a beautifully made Swiss watch, but what I was really working on was an old Maine fishing boat engine: overbuilt, inefficient, never-failed and repaired by simple measures."

Rappaport died December 14, 2010, in Bar Harbor, Maine, at the age of 88.

== Honors and awards ==
Rappaport was elected as a fellow of the American Association for the Advancement of Science in 1983. A laboratory building at MDIBL is named after him.
