= Jelena Jovčić =

Serbian documentary filmmaker

- Born: Belgrade, Serbia
- Known for: Documentary film

Jelena Jovčić is a Serbian documentary filmmaker.

== Biography ==
As a filmmaker Jovčić is a director, cinematographer, and editor of film. She is also a producer of documentaries and promo films.

Jovčić has been a Museum Curator at the Ethnographic Museum in Belgrade. She is currently the editor of the International Film Festival of Ethnological Film.

== Recognition ==
In 2007, Jovčić was part of a select group of eight Serbian filmmakers, whose works were screened at the Avalon Theatre, Washington, DC, USA.
