= Kurt Rappaport =

American real estate businessman

- Born: Kurt Fleming Rappaport; January 26, 1971 (age 54); Los Angeles, California
- Education: B.A. in Business from University of Southern California
- Occupation: Real Estate Agent
- Children: 3

Kurt Rappaport is an American real estate investor and entrepreneur. He is co-founder and CEO of Westside Estate Agency.

== Background ==
Rappaport is the son of Floyd A. Rappaport, a Detroit-born entertainment lawyer of Jewish descent who represented celebrities including Irwin Allen, Peter Lawford, and Steve McQueen. Rappaport graduated from the University of Southern California where he worked in real estate part-time. After school, he worked for Merrill Lynch Realty, Fred Sands Estates, and Stan Herman, Stephen Shapiro and Associates before co-founding the Westside Estate Agency in 1999 with Stephen Shapiro. In 2006, the agency added a Malibu office and booked more than $1 billion in sales with co-founders Rappaport and Shapiro ranked as the top two agents in Los Angeles County, according to the Los Angeles Times. As of 2015, WEA has over 100 full-time agents with offices in Beverly Hills, Malibu and Miami with over $3 billion in annual sales.

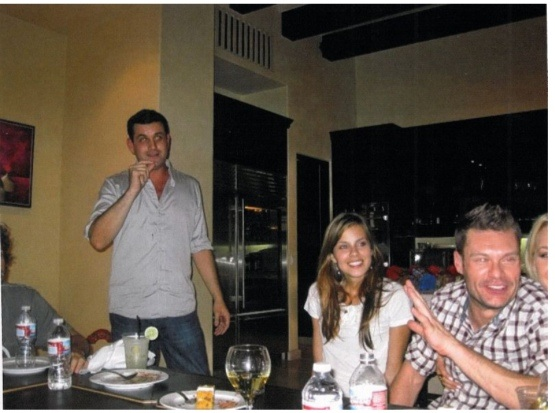
Kurt Rappaport (standing), with model Izabela Garcia, and Ryan Seacrest.

== Career ==
Rappaport has represented David Geffen, Adam Levine, Ellen DeGeneres, Ryan Seacrest, Tom Ford, Warren Beatty and Annette Bening, Tom Brady and Gisele Bundchen, Sean Parker, Sean Combs, Dr. Dre, Larry Ellison, who Rappaport represented on a buying spree that included 30 Malibu properties valued at more than $600 million. Rappaport has owned and developed some of the most valuable real estate in California. Many of his homes have been featured in Architectural Digest and numerous other publications.

== Media ventures ==
Rappaport is the executive producer of "London Fields", a feature film currently in post-production, based on the novel London Fields by Martin Amis.

== Personal life ==
In December, 2020, Rappaport married Serbian model, Zorana Kuzmanovic. He owned a 6-acre Malibu estate valued at $100M that features the longest private pool in the State of California. Prior to residing in Malibu, Rappaport sold his own home in Beverly Hills to Tom Cruise for $32.5M

== Awards ==
On September 21, 2016, in New York City, Rappaport, along with Martin Scorsese, received The Friar's Club Icon Award, at a black-tie charity event hosted by Ryan Seacrest and Leonardo DiCaprio at Cipriani Wall Street.

From 2016-2021, Rappaport has been named by Los Angeles Business Journal as being one of the 500 Most Influential People In Los Angeles.

In January 2018, Rappaport was honored by Major League Baseball and received the Dave Winfield Humanitarian Award at the Beverly Hills Hilton International Ballroom. The award show ceremony was televised on MLB Network.
