= Sonya Rapoport =

- Born: October 6, 1923; Boston, Massachusetts
- Died: June 1, 2015 (aged 91); Berkeley, California
- Known for: conceptual art, new media art, feminist art
- Website: sonyarapoport.org

Sonya Rapoport (October 6, 1923 – June 1, 2015) was an American conceptual, feminist, and New media artist. She began her career as a painter, and later became best known for computer-mediated interactive installations and participatory web-based artworks.

== Early life ==
Sonya (née Goldberg) was born on October 6, 1923, in Boston, Massachusetts, and grew up in Brookline, Massachusetts. There, she regularly attended Saturday classes at the Boston Museum of Fine Arts where she studied with Karl Zerbe. She spent her childhood summers at the art colony in Ogunquit, Maine.

== Education ==
Rapoport studied biology at Boston University and economics at New York University, graduating with a B.A. in 1946. In 1944, she married Henry Rapoport, a chemistry professor, and went with him to New York, Washington, D.C., and then to Berkeley, CA. Sonya Rapoport pursued her studies in art throughout their moves. She attended the Art Students League of New York where she studied with Reginald Marsh, then entered the Corcoran School of Art and Design to study figurative art and oil painting, and finally enrolled in the graduate program in Art Practice at the University of California, Berkeley, where she studied with Erle Loran, receiving her M.A. in 1949. The Berkeley art practice curriculum at that time was heavily influenced by the aesthetic philosophy of Hans Hofmann, although the school produced artists as divergent in their practices as Rapoport, Jay DeFeo, and Sam Francis.

== Career ==
=== Early career ===
In 1971 Rapoport discovered a series of vintage geological survey charts from an Idaho Snake River Dam project in an antique architect's desk she had purchased. She used these charts as a background for drawing and painting, as well as stencils she made from found objects. Objects such as a pool-cue holder signified an udder, while a plastic uterus from an anatomy kit stood for the womb: a lexicon of feminine symbols she referred to as her Nu-Shu language. Nüshu is a script created in the 15th century as a “secret language,” used exclusively by women in Hunan Province, China. Rapoport used this feminist pattern language extensively throughout the 1970s on large-scale paintings as well as mixed-media works on found continuous-feed computer paper.

In the late 1970s, Rapoport also developed a collaborative practice as her work moved away from painting and drawing into the realm of installation, performance, and research-based mixed-media projects. She collaborated with research chemists, software engineers, and anthropologists to realize her increasingly complex projects. For instance, as part her collaboration with the anthropologist Dorothy Washburn during the 1970s, Rapoport incorporated archeological notations based on the study of Native American artifacts into her computer drawings.

Between 1979 and 1983 Rapoport worked on her conceptual project Objects on My Dresser, which unfolded in eleven successive phases over the five-year period. The final, twelfth phase was developed in the last year of Rapoport’s life and exhibited posthumously (2015). Objects on My Dresser marked Rapoport’s clear departure from her painting and object-making practice and anticipated her later interactive performance and new media work. Rapoport collaborated with psychologist Winifred de Vos to interpret the personal significance of mementos and souvenirs that accumulated on her bedroom dresser, examining them through psychoanalysis, computer coding, and scientific methods. The 12 phases ranged from installations and audience participation performances to single-page publications, and artists’ books, presented at venues including Franklin Furnace, Artists Space, and Heresies Magazine. A foundational project in conceptual and feminist art, Objects on My Dresser was also pioneering in its turn to computing and data visualization.

During the 1980s, Rapoport developed related conceptual works that utilized data visualization and computer coding. In some of these projects, Rapoport introduced computer-assisted interactive installations, where the audience was invited to participate and contribute data for the projects’ subsequent iterations. These include Biorhythm, Shoe-Field, Digital Mudra, The Animated Soul: Gateway to Your Ka, and Sexual Jealousy: The Shadow of Love.

=== Late career ===
From 1989 to 2013 Rapoport’s artistic focus shifted to net art. During this period she produced more than a dozen interactive web projects. Rapoport was an early adopter of internet technology and was affiliated with a community of like-minded creators associated with MIT’s Leonardo Magazine, including Judy Malloy and Meredith Tromble. These works were motivated by her interest in the humanistic potential of computers, and informed by her knowledge of programming and experience creating work that responded to viewer’s choices.

Reflecting Rapoport’s interest in the social construction of gender, race, and religion, she sourced imagery from a variety of sources, including art history, the sciences, newspapers, and her earlier works. The digitally-collaged imagery and innovative hypertext interfaces that comprise these works embody the early internet aesthetic.

In the 2010s, Rapoport’s contribution to contemporary art was recognized in two survey exhibitions and the volume Pairing of Polarities: The Life and Art of Sonya Rapoport, edited by Terri Cohn. In 2014, the Bancroft Library of Western Americana at the University of California Berkeley acquired Rapoport’s archives.

== Legacy ==
The Sonya Rapoport Legacy Trust was established and endowed during Rapoport's lifetime to preserve her work and to broaden its critical and historical recognition. The Trust supports her legacy through a variety of initiatives including exhibitions, loans of artworks, research, publications, conservation, and educational programs for the public and the scholarly communities. It also maintains a collection of Rapoport's artwork in a variety of media and encourages collaborative projects with artists, writers, and scientists in recognition of Rapoport’s unique methodology. Study of the Sonya Rapoport Papers at the Bancroft Library, UC Berkeley is also encouraged.

== Recent exhibitions ==
Sonya Rapoport: biorhythm, San Jose Museum of Art, San Jose, California, 2020

Spotlight, Frieze New York, 2020

The Computer Pays its Debt: Women, Textiles, and Technology, 1965-1985, Center for Craft, Asheville, NC, 2020

Shifting Terrain – Works on Paper from the Collection, SFMOMA, 2020

Refiguring the Future, Hunter College Art Galleries, New York, 2019

Sonya Rapoport: An Aesthetic Response, Casemore Kirkeby Gallery, 2019

Yes or No? Krowswork, Oakland, California 2015

ImPOSSIBLE CONVERSATIONS? Fresno Art Museum, Fresno, California, 2014

ImPOSSIBLE CONVERSATIONS? Data Gathering Event. Martina }{ Johnston Gallery, Berkeley, California, 2013

Spaces of Life: The Art of Sonya Rapoport. Mills College Art Museum, Oakland, California, 2012

Sonya Rapoport: Pairings of Polarities. Kala Institute Art Gallery, Berkeley, California, 2011

== Bibliography ==
- Cohn, Terri; Efimova, Alla. Sonya Rapoport: Biorhythm. San Jose Museum of Art, 2020
- Cohn, Terri. "When Sonya Rapoport said 'OK' to computers." Frieze, April 2020
- Barcio, Phillip. "How Sonya Rapoport Used Abstraction to Pioneer Computer Art," Ideelart, February 2020
- Jones, Leslie. "The Personal is Computable: Sonya Rapoport." Art in Print, January 2019
- Cohn, Terri, Efimova, Alla. “Sonya Rapoport: Ensemble Performance.” Performa Magazine, March 2017
- Efimova, Alla; Cohn, Terri. Sonya Rapoport: Yes or No? Mills College Art Museum, 2016
- Cohn, Terri, ed. Pairing of Polarities: the Life and Art of Sonya Rapoport. Heyday, 2012
