= Tom Rapoport =

German-American cell biologist (born 1947)

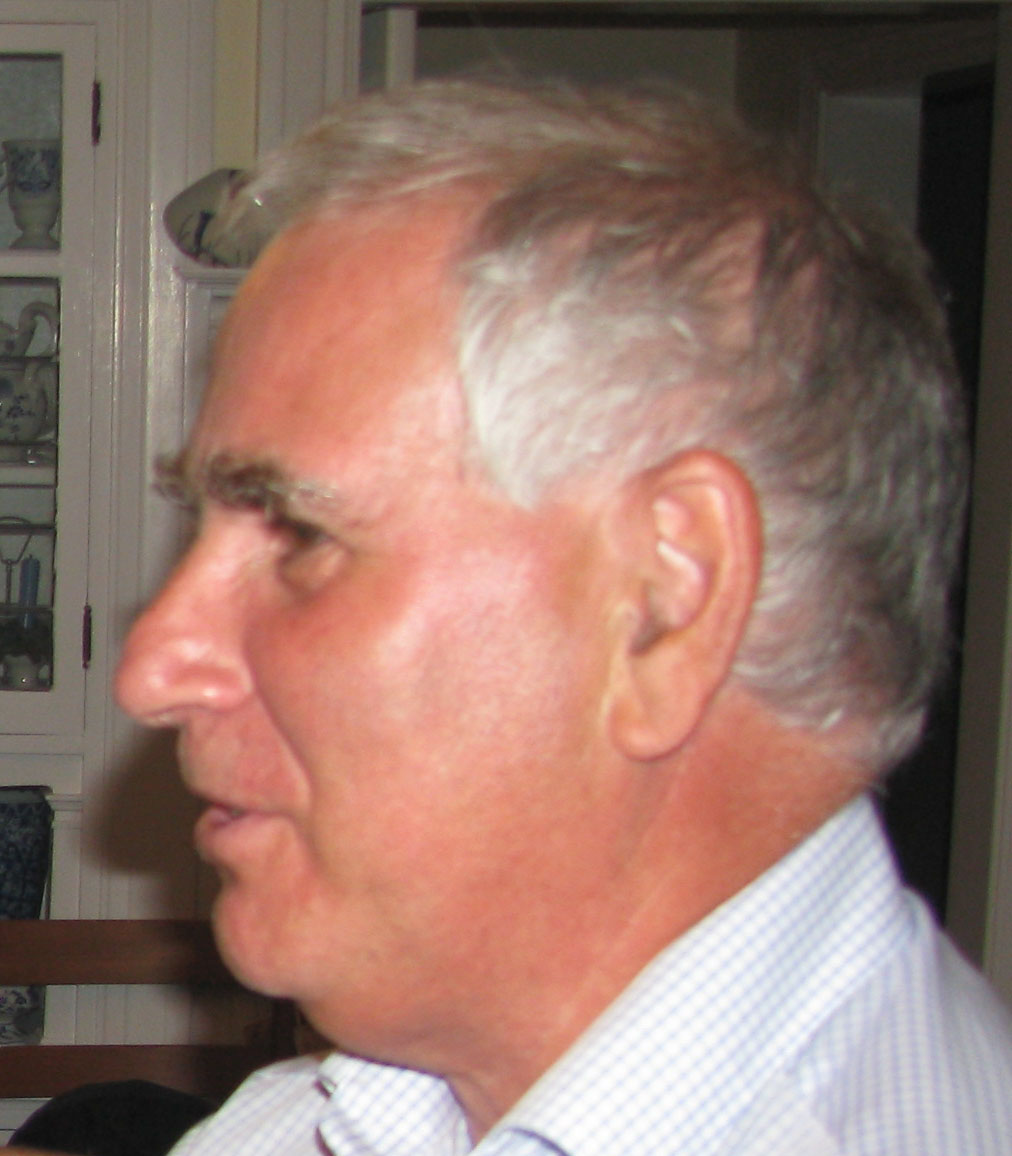
- Born: June 17, 1947 (age 79); Cincinnati, Ohio
- Citizenship: United States, Germany (East Germany until 1990)
- Education: Humboldt University
- Employers: East German Academy of Sciences; Harvard Medical School; Howard Hughes Medical Institute
- Known for: Early development of metabolic control analysis; the endoplasmic reticulum
- Parents: Samuel Mitja Rapoport (father); Ingeborg Rapoport (mother)
- Relatives: Michael Rapoport (brother)
- Scientific career
- Fields: Cell biology

Tom Abraham Rapoport (born June 17, 1947) is a German-American cell biologist who studies protein transport in cells. Currently, he is the DonW. Fawcett Professor of Cell Biology at Harvard Medical School and a Howard Hughes Medical Institute investigator. Born in Cincinnati, Ohio, he grew up in East Germany. In 1995, he accepted an offer to become a professor at Harvard Medical School. In 1997, he became an investigator of the Howard Hughes Medical Institute. He is a member of the American and German National Academies of Science, a fellow of the American Academy of Arts and Sciences, a fellow of the American Society for Cell Biology and a fellow of the American Association for the Advancement of Science.

== Biography ==
Rapoport was born in Cincinnati in 1947. His parents, Samuel Mitja Rapoport and Ingeborg Rapoport, had fled the Nazis, and when he was three years old, they fled the United States in 1950 due to being investigated for un-American activities. After a brief stay in Vienna, they finally settled in Berlin in the German Democratic Republic in 1952, where his father became a Professor for Biochemistry and director of the Institute of Physiological Chemistry of the Humboldt-University, and his mother became a Professor for neonatology at the Charite Hospital. His brother is mathematician Michael Rapoport. Tom A. Rapoport received his PhD on mathematical modeling of the kinetics of inorganic pyrophosphatase in 1972 from Humboldt University. He worked in the lab of Peter Heitmann, and his father, Samuel Mitja Rapoport, was head of the Institute of Physiological Chemistry. At Humboldt, he collaborated with Reinhart Heinrich on the mathematical modeling of glycolysis in red blood cells, leading to the establishment of metabolic control theory on which they submitted a joint 'habilitation' thesis. At the same time, he worked with Sinaida Rosenthal, a former student of his father, on cloning the insulin gene from carp.

In 1979, he moved to the Zentralinstitut für Molekularbiologie der Akademie der Wissenschaften der DDR, later called the Max Delbrück Center for Molecular Medicine, where he became a professor in 1985. He moved to the United States, the country his parents fled from in 1950, in 1995. He has been a professor at the Harvard Medical School since 1995, and an HHMI investigator since 1997.

He studies several aspects of cellular secretion, including the mechanisms by which newly synthesized proteins are translocated from the cytosol to the lumen of the endoplasmic reticulum by the Sec61 complex (also known as the translocon), how misfolded secretory proteins are degraded by endoplasmic reticulum associated protein degradation (also known as ERAD), and how reticulons and related proteins regulate the morphology of the endoplasmic reticulum.

== Selected research articles ==
- Voeltz, GK; Prinz WA; Shibata Y; Rist JM; Rapoport TA (10 February 2006). "A class of membrane proteins shaping the tubular endoplasmic reticulum". Cell. 124 (3): 573–586. doi:10.1016/j.cell.2005.11.047. PMID 16469703. S2CID 12760025.
- Ye, Y; Shibata Y; Yun C; Ron D; Rapoport TA (24 June 2004). "A membrane protein complex mediates retro-translocation from the ER lumen into the cytosol". Nature. 429 (6994): 841–847. Bibcode:2004Natur.429..841Y. doi:10.1038/nature02656. PMID 15215856. S2CID 4317750.
- Van den Berg B, Clemons WM Jr, Collinson I, Modis Y, Hartmann E, Harrison SC, Rapoport TA (1 January 2003). "X-ray structure of a protein-conducting channel". Nature. 427 (6969): 36–44. doi:10.1038/nature02218. PMID 14661030. S2CID 4360143.
- Görlich, D; Rapoport TA (19 November 1993). "Protein translocation into proteoliposomes reconstituted from purified components of the endoplasmic reticulum membrane". Cell. 75 (4): 615–630. doi:10.1016/0092-8674(93)90483-7. PMID 8242738.
- Heinrich, R; Rapoport TA (15 February 1974). "A linear steady-state treatment of enzymatic chains. General properties, control and effector strength". Eur. J. Biochem. 42 (1): 89–95. doi:10.1111/j.1432-1033.1974.tb03318.x. PMID 4830198.

== Awards ==
- 2004 Awarded Otto Warburg Medal of the German Society for Biochemistry and Molecular Biology
- 2005 Awarded Max Delbrück Medal of the Max Delbrück Center for Molecular Medicine.
- 2007 Sir Hans Krebs Medal
- 2011 Awarded the Schleiden Medal from the Leopoldina
