= Mat Rappaport =

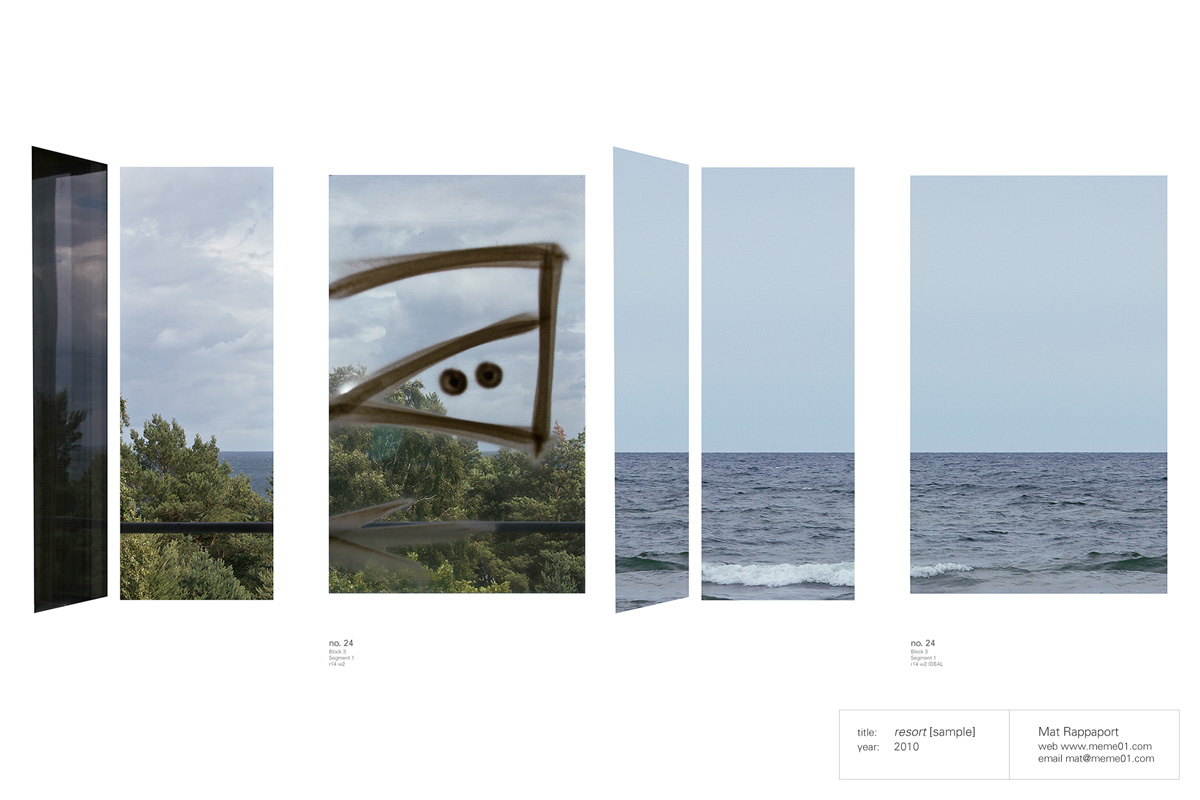
- sample image from the resort photo archive
- Born: 1971; Boston, Massachusetts
- Education: University of Notre Dame, Tufts University, School of the Museum of Fine Arts, Boston
- Known for: New media art, Video art, Photography
- Awards: Propeller Grant (2011), Howard Fellowship (2006), Mary L. Nohl Fellowship for Individual Artists Award (2005)
- Website: www.meme01.com

Mat Rappaport (born 1971) is an internationally exhibited new media and installation artist, curator, and educator. He is currently an associate professor at Columbia College Chicago, a board member of the New Media Caucus, and a founding member of v1b3 (Video in the Built Environment). He currently lives and works in Chicago.

== Education ==
Rappaport earned a BFA from the School of the Museum of Fine Arts, Boston and Tufts University. While an undergraduate Rappaport spend a year studying at Hebrew University and the Bezalel Academy of Art and Design in Jerusalem, Israel. Upon returning to the United States, he was an intern in Objects Conservation at the Museum of Fine Arts Boston. Rappaport received his MFA in Studio Art from the University of Notre Dame.

== Work ==
Rappaport's projects include video installation, public art interventions, mobile media performance, and interactive installation dealing primarily with the mutability of architecture and media representation as sites of meaning. His creative works and published writing explore public art and media. Specific works include a game we play an augmented reality application to impose a video game atmosphere onto the Chicago Financial District. The project was funded by a Propeller Fund grant from threewalls in Chicago., touristic intents, a multi-modal documentary art project that explores the use of architecture and tourism as a projection of political ideology and propaganda., and current, a site-specific video and sound installation, made for showing over the Delaware River, between New York and Pennsylvania. A flashlight is programmed to flash morse code over the river at a video screen on the opposite side. The code spells out a portion of the Constitution about interstate trade. Earlier works, such as way, a single channel video, made in 2005 has been critically reviewed. His work has been featured in a wide range of exhibition venues, including the Under Surveillance exhibition at the John Michael Kohler Arts Center, along with other well-known artists such as Trevor Paglen and William Betts, who deal with surveillance in the contemporary world.

== Awards ==
2011 Propeller Grant
Propeller Fund, Chicago, IL
2006 Howard Fellowship
Howard Foundation, Brown University, Providence, RI
Center for 21st Century Studies Fellowship
