= David Rappaport (designer) =

American fashion designer

- Rappaport circa 2007
- Born: June 19, 1914; New York City, New York
- Died: April 5, 2010 (aged 95)
- Occupations: fashion manufacturer/designer, painter
- Spouse: Francesca Rappaport (1939–2010)
- Parent(s): Joseph and Sophie Rappaport
- Website: http://www.davidrappaportart.com

David Rappaport (June 6, 1914 – April 5, 2010) was an American fashion manufacturer, designer and painter.

== Early life ==
David Rappaport was born in Harlem as the son of Russian-born Jewish clothing cutter, Joseph Rappaport, and his wife Sophie. Growing up on the Lower East Side, his family struggled to survive, especially during the strike of Amalgamated Clothing Workers of America. His father tried to supplement earnings as a door-to-door salesman and was accompanied by his son.

Though he aspired to become a medical doctor, David Rappaport began to work to support his younger siblings. At age seventeen, he was hired by a friend of the family at a necktie manufacturing company. He was later hired as a packer of neckwear collections in the Midwestern sales division. At night, he attended the Fashion Institute of Technology high school of textile design.

== Business career ==
In 1934, aged 20, David Rappaport borrowed $700 and with his brother, Mannie, founded his own company, Staple Neckwear Co., which he described as "the smallest neckwear firm in the United States". Selling modest designs and "solid color and classic striped" ties, the company shipped $17,000 worth of neckwear in the first year and annually increased the output by 20%.

In 1937 the company changed its name to David Creations but after legal threats by the John David chain, they adopted the name Damon Creations, Inc., a loose conjunction of their first names.

Since 1937, Rappaport designed a group of English striped repps combining three colours in eighteen different combinations. He began matching blue and gold in stripe patterns. In 1942, the Rappaports introduced knitted ties to his brand. In 1961, the ladies' knitwear division Francesca of Damon was founded under the creative control of David Rappaport's wife Francesca. Damon Creations went public in 1967.

Damon's first TV commercial was released in 1968, the same year the company released two new lines of men's apparel. By 1969, the full product line of the company included neckwear, knitted Italian and Domestic shirts, sweaters and jackets. The merchandise also featured an Milano collar with a wide stay, antique leather and wool knit jackets.

The company's volume rose from 8.7 million in 1964 to 25 million in 1973. Having previously manufactured mostly in Italy, Damon acquired domestic plants and subsidiaries in the United States, opened a distribution center in North Bergen, New Jersey and moved into a larger plant in Long Island City. By 1973, Damon Creations had 23 showrooms in 14 cities with 4,500 sales accounts. Each color pattern was then entered into a computer database that did an analysis of its popularity and gave a sales projection based upon past records.

Michael Rappaport, David's son, became president of Damon Creations and his father remained chairman of the board.

In 1988, after 54 years, David Rappaport sold his interest in the business. The company was merged with Enro Industries.

== Honours ==

In 1956, David Rappaport was named an honorary alumni of Brandeis University.

In 1969, he was awarded the Order of the Star of Italian Solidarity with the title Commendatore for strengthening commercial relations between the United States and Italy.

In 1972, Rappaport was honoured by the Brotherhood Award for Distinguished Service in the Field of Human Relations, presented by the National Conference of Christians and Jews, by the Order of the Palmetto, by Governor John C. West of South Carolina, and the 25th State of Israel Anniversary Award for his bond donations to the foundation of Israel.

In 1976, he was voted "Man of the Year" by the Associated Men's Wear Retailers of New York for his philanthropic work, which also included support for the United Jewish Appeal, the Association for the Help of Retarded Children, the National Jewish Hospital, the Federation of Jewish Philanthropies, the City of Hope, B'nai B'rith, Anti-Defamation League, Boys Town of Italy. He also helped found Temple Sholom of New Milfold, Connecticut and the University of Haifa.

In 1977, Rappaport received the Annual Achievement Award of the Textile Veterans Association for his work in civic and philanthropic endeavors.

== Artistic career ==
After his retirement from business in 1988, Rappaport dedicated himself full-time to painting. His work combines patterns and fabric and uses offset geometric units that also involve color schemes. Rappaport has been described as the "master of hues and tones" and as "having an impeccable taste and eye for design". Rappaport stated: "You must be creative, understand color and how one color affects another color."

In 1997, aged 83, Rappaport was discovered as a painter when Tom Kalenderian of Barneys New York visited Rappaport's studio to shop his neckwear line. Kalenderian suggested showing them to Simon Doonan, Barney's creative director. Three months later, sixteen of his paintings were displayed along with designer men's fashions.

In 2002, Rappaport's exhibit "Not For Sale" opened at the Taller Boricua Gallery, which showcased over eighty pieces completed since 1989, including work he had done after his stroke.

From September 2003 to June 2004, Rappaport's work was exhibited in conjunction with the exhibition The Art of Aging at the Hebrew Union College. One of Rappaport's paintings was also featured in the book The Art of Aging, which was published upon the launch of the gallery showing by the United Jewish Communities.
