= Samuel Mitja Rapoport =

American biochemist (1912–2004)

- Born: 27 November 1912; Volochysk, Russian Empire
- Died: 7 July 2004 (aged 91); Berlin, Germany
- Education: University of Vienna
- Known for: Extending the maximum storage time for blood from one to three weeks
- Spouse: Ingeborg Rapoport
- Children: Tom Rapoport, Michael Rapoport
- Scientific career
- Fields: Biochemistry
- Workplaces: Institute for Medical Chemistry, Vienna; Children's Hospital Research Foundation in Cincinnati, Ohio; Humboldt University of Berlin

Samuel Mitja Rapoport (27 November 1912 – 7 July 2004) was a Russian-born German university professor of biochemistry in East Germany. Of Jewish descent and a committed communist, he fled Austria after its annexation by Nazi Germany, and moved to the United States. In 1950, as a result of an investigation of un-American activities, he was offered a professorship in East Berlin. He was married to pediatrician Ingeborg Rapoport.

== Biography ==
Rapoport was born into a Jewish family in Volhynia near the Russian-Austrian border in what is now Ukraine and his family resided there from 1912 to 1916. They later moved to Odessa, Ukraine on the Black Sea coast. At the conclusion of World War I, he saw the Russian Revolution and witnessed the barbaric warfare of the Russian Civil War.

His family left Odessa for Vienna, Austria in 1920. Already sympathetic to left-wing views, he joined the Communist Party out of protest against the rise of fascism. At the age of 13 he found in his father's archives works written by Friedrich Engels. By reading them he was fascinated by socialist ideas. His own painful experiences of war, injustice, banishment, political and racial persecution brought him to a socialist world-view up to his end of life. He was active in communist organizations from his youth and became a member of the Socialist pupils in Vienna, then he participated in the illegal Austrian communist movement. But he didn't follow ideological extremes. He was directed by a deep humanity, he loved reasoning and discussing, he had a great inquiring mind and he had the ability to connect theoretical knowledge, philosophical views and practical realization.

In Vienna he studied medicine and chemistry receiving his doctorate. In 1933 he attended the Institute for Medical Chemistry and worked on the analysis of amino acids in the blood serum.

When the annexation of Austria by Nazi-Germany was imminent, he received a scholarship for scientific studies and clinical work at the Children's Hospital Research Foundation in Cincinnati, Ohio in 1938. At the time this hospital was a leader in research and medical treatment. During his tenure at this hospital he served as a pediatrician and earned a second doctorate.

During World War II his research focused on blood conservation. He worked to prolong the shelf life of blood altering conservation media in order to preserve the energy metabolism of erythrocytes. He succeeded in extending the maximum storage time for blood from one to three weeks. His efforts saved the lives of thousands of US soldiers, marines, sailors and airmen. For these efforts he was honored by President Harry S. Truman with a Certificate of Merit.

In 1944 while in Cincinnati he met the German emigrant and physician Ingeborg Syllm, they married in 1946. Ingeborg Syllm, born in 1912 in Cameroon was the daughter of a Protestant couple, she had studied medicine in Hamburg, and fled to the US in September 1938.

While in the US he supported the trade union and communist movement. Together with his wife he delivered the paper "The Worker" on the weekends and got involved with the civil rights movement.

Despite his gratitude towards the United States, which had offered him citizenship and work, Rapoport continued to be politically active as a member of the Communist Party. During a congress of pediatricians in Switzerland in 1950 he received information that he was a target of the anticommunist McCarthy commission. As a result of this warning he chose not to return to the US and his wife brought their children to Zürich. The Rapoports moved to Vienna, where for a short time he again worked at the Institute for Medical Chemistry. But the university refused his appointment for professorship due to the intervention of the US government. France, Great Britain and the Soviet Union all refused his services. Rapoport rejected a job offer by the Weizmann Institute in Israel on the grounds of his anti-Zionist beliefs.

In 1951 the East German Humboldt University in East Berlin offered Rapoport the professorship and directorship of the Institute for Physiological Chemistry at the Charité Hospital. He accepted political asylum as well as the chance to continue his work.

While in Berlin he wrote the text, Medical Biochemistry dictated in only three months. This book became a bestseller in both the medical communities in East and West Germany. It was printed in 9 editions with 60,000 copies, and was translated in several languages.

Samuel Rapoport was the most important representative of East German biochemistry. Several of students of Rapoport were appointed to professorships. After the unification of Germany he became president of the newly founded Leibniz-Societät, which consisted of former members of the disbanded Academy of Sciences of the GDR.

When in 1982 the committee "Physicians of GDR for prevention of nuclear war" was founded, Rapoport was elected the chairman. Up to his death he continued fighting against nuclear weapons.

Ingeborg Rapoport continued to be active in her medical profession and in social action. She worked from 1952 as pediatrician in Berlin. In 1964 she became a professor and had the professorship for neonatology of the Charité Hospital from 1969 to 1973. She was co-founder of the Society of Perinatology of the GDR and council-member of the European Society of Perinatology.

The children of Samuel and Ingeborg Rapoport are Tom, a professor at Harvard Medical School and a Howard Hughes Medical Institute investigator, Michael, a mathematician, Susan Richter, a pediatrician, and Lisa Lange, a nurse.

In May 2015, Ingeborg Rapoport defended a doctoral dissertation about diphtheria that she submitted in 1938 to the University of Hamburg. The Nazi regime then in power had prevented her from taking the required oral examination due to her being part Jewish, but after updating her scientific knowledge about diphtheria, she passed a 45-minute examination by three professors from the university 77 years later, at age 102. She received her degree in a ceremony on 9 June, making her the oldest known person in history to receive a doctorate.

== Scientific work ==
His work focused on the water-electrolyte balance and the metabolism of the erythrocytes. He described the role of the 2,3-bisphosphoglycerate for the anaerobic production of energy in the erythrocytes (Luebering-Rapoport pathway). Jane Luebering was a technical assistant of Rapoport. Rapoport detected the eminent importance of the ATP concentration for the survivability of the erythrocytes.

In World War II there was a great need of transfusions. Many scientists worked on an improvement of the defensibility of the blood bottles (C.R. Drew, P. Rous, J.R. Turner, J.F. Loutit, P.L. Mollison, I.M. Young u.a.). Among them Rapoport was very successful. Due to his works the ACD-medium was established, the pH-environment, the storage temperature and the processing were improved. His research was supported by Paul Hoxworth, who founded in 1938 one of the first United States blood banks in Cincinnati. Thus the survivability of the bottled blood could be extended from 1 to 3 weeks.

In 1948, together with two other American physicians he reported his results about the Ekiri disease in Japan. They showed the helpfulness of infusions with calcium which ameliorated the symptoms like convulsions.

In 1952 Rapoport founded at the Berlin Charité a Biochemical Institute. His scientific interest was to further the clinical-biochemical research, especially the investigation of reticulocytes and of the enzyme lipoxygenase. He was an early a representative of the thesis that the degradation of proteins is energy-dependent.

He encouraged the pharmaceutical production of insulin in the GDR.

Up to 1996 Rapoport published or was a participant in 666 scientific works. In 1969 he became a member of the Academy of Science of the German Democratic Republic. He received several honorary doctorates. The documentary Die Rapoports – Unsere drei Leben (The Rapoports – our three lives, ARTE/ZDF 2003), by Sissi Hüetlin and Britta Wauer (2005 awarded the Adolf-Grimme-prize) is a testament to the lives of the scientists Samuel and Ingeborg Rapoport.

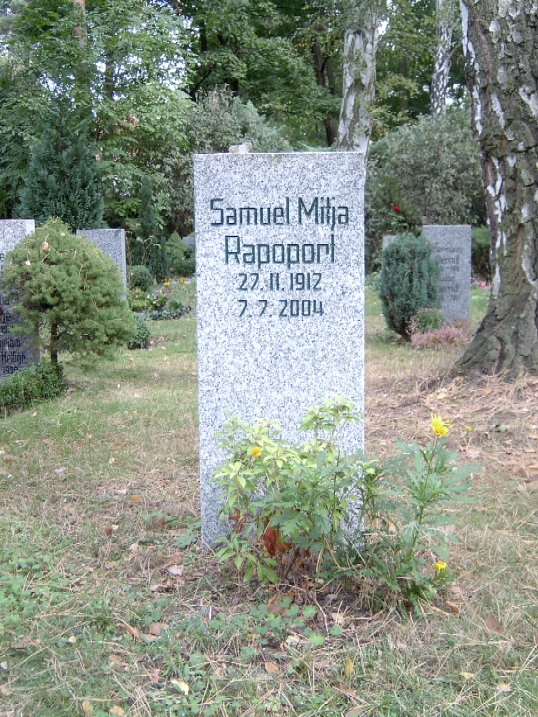
grave by Samuel Mitja Rapoport at the cemetery Pankow III in Berlin

== Sources and literature ==
- Obituary, BMJ VOLUME 329 7 AUGUST 2004 bmj.com
- Rapoport S., Wing M.: Dimensional, osmotic, and chemical changes of erythrocytes in stored blood. Blood preserved in sodium citrate, neutral, and acid citrate-glucose (ACD) mixtures. J Clin Invest. 1947 Jul;26(4):591–615.
- Dodd, K., Buddingh, G.J., Rapoport, S.: The etiology of Ekiri, a highly fatal disease of Japanese children. Pediatrics Vol. 3 No. 1 January 1949, pp. 9–19
- Rapoport, S. and J. Luebering: An Optical Study Of Diphosphoglycerate Mutase (From the Children's Hospital Research Foundation, Cincinnati, Ohio, and the Institute of Medical Chemistry of the University of Vienna, Austria) J. Biol. Chem. 1952; 196:583
- Rapoport, S. M., Rohland L. (Hrsg). Medizin und globale Menschheitsprobleme. Vorträge. Veröff. Med. Ges. 1997; 3: 1-55 (Heft 9)
- Marxismus, Exil und jüdische Identität. Der Biochemiker Samuel Mitja Rapoport. Jüdisches Echo 49 (October 2000). 337–345.
- Frömmel, C.: Vortrag zum 90. Geburtstag von Prof. Dr. Samuel Rapoport bei einem Symposium der Charité, Berlin, 2.12.2002
- Rapoport, I.: Meine ersten drei Leben – die Erinnerungen von Ingeborg Rapoport, 2002 NORA-Verlag
- Rapoport, S.M.: Die Erfahrungen des Exils. TRANS Internet-Zeitschrift für Kulturwissenschaften 15. Nr. November 2003
- Schönfeld, Th.: Samuel Mitja Rapoport (1912–2004) – In memoriam Mitteilungen der Alfred Klahr Gesellschaft, Nr. 3/2004
- Goldenberg, H. : Nachruf Univ.-Prof. Dr. Samuel Mitja Rapoport (1912–2004) Newsletter vom 20.07.2004 Gesammelt vom Informationsmanagement der medizinischen Universität Wien
- Jacobasch, Gisela / Rohland, Lothar (Hrsg.) Samuel Mitja Rapoport (1912–2004) [= Medizin und Gesellschaft, Bd. 52], Berlin 2005, 103 S., ISBN 3-89626-536-9
- Graff, J.: Ingeborg Rapoport to Become Oldest Recipient of Doctorate After Nazi Injustice is Righted. Wall St. J., May 14, 2015.
