= David C. Rapoport =

American political scientist (1929–2024)

David Charles Rapoport
- Born: January 7, 1929; Pittsburgh, Pennsylvania, U.S.
- Died: February 10, 2024 (aged 95)

David Charles Rapoport (January 7, 1929 – February 10, 2024) was an American Professor Emeritus of Political Science at University of California, Los Angeles (UCLA) who focused on the study of terrorism.

== Biography ==
Rapoport received his Ph.D. at University of California, Berkeley in 1960. In 1962 he joined the UCLA political science department. In the late 1960s he became interested in terrorism and in 1969 taught the first terrorist course in the U.S. In 1989, he established the journal Terrorism and Political Violence and is its chief editor., credited as “one of two journals which has made terrorism into an academic field”. He received 12 Awards from a variety of Foundations including the Social Science Research Council, Ford Foundation, Fulbright, American Council of Learned Societies, National Institute of Mental Health and Harry Frank Guggenheim.

After retiring in 1995, he founded the Center for the Study of Religion UCLA and became the Chair of the Interdepartmental Religion Major 1995–7. He continued teaching until 2011, and received the UCLA Emeritus Distinguished Dickson Award in 2007. Rapoport died on February 10, 2024, at the age of 95.

== Academic publications ==
Rapoport wrote and edited six books, 50 academic articles and 12 op-ed newspaper columns. Ten academic publications were republished in Spanish, French and German. Two of his academic articles were written for Encyclopedias, and a third will be published in 2017.

He wrote a series of articles on ancient religious traditions, including their interaction with terrorism. He also wrote a number of essays on apocalyptic movements in the modern world, especially in Christianity.

Rapaport's 1999 article “Terrorism” in the Encyclopedia of Violence, Peace and Conflict contained an analysis of the history of modern global rebel terror. He argues that political concerns and technological development produced the new iterations of terrorism in the form of "waves". The "new terrorism" began in the 1880s and has produced four different overlapping waves, the Anarchist, Anti-Colonial, New Left and Religious. The argument drew little attention until Rapoport published a second article on the subject immediately after the 9/11 attack, “The Fourth Wave: September 11 in the History of Terrorism” in Current History. The aim was to demonstrate that although the tragedy “created a resolve... to end terror everywhere”, the history of modern global terror did not inspire much confidence that this resolve would succeed. The article was widely influential in the field of terrorism studies.

== Books ==
- Waves of Global Terrorism: From 1879 to the Present (New York: Columbia University Press, 2022) ISBN 9780231133036
- Terrorism: Critical Concepts in Political Science 4 vols.(New York: Routledge, 2006) ISBN 0415316502
- Inside Terrorist Organizations (New York: Columbia University Press, 1988) ISBN 0231067208
- The Democratic Experience and Political Violence (Portland, OR: Frank. Cass, 2001) (with Leonard Weinberg) ISBN 0714651508
- The Morality of Terrorism: Religious and Secular Justifications (New York: Columbia University Press, 1989) with Yonah Alexander 2nd Edition ISBN 0 -231-06753-4
- The Rationalization of Terrorism (Frederick, MD: University Publications of America, 1982 with Yonah Alexander ISBN 0890934134
- Assassination and Terrorism (Toronto: Canadian Broadcasting Corp., 1971) 3 editions
