= 2026 in Wales =

- Centuries: 19th; 20th; 21st
- Decades: 2000s; 2010s; 2020s
- See also: List of years in Wales; Timeline of Welsh history 2026 in The United Kingdom England Scotland Elsewhere

Events from the year 2026 in Wales.

== Incumbents ==
- First Minister
  - Eluned Morgan (until 12 May)
  - Rhun ap Iorwerth (from 12 May)
- Llywydd of the Senedd
  - Elin Jones (until 12 May)
  - Huw Irranca-Davies (from 12 May)
- Secretary of State for Wales
  - Jo Stevens (until 20 July)
  - Stephen Kinnock (from 20 July)
- Archbishop of Wales – Cherry Vann
- Archdruid of the National Eisteddfod of Wales – Mererid Hopwood
- National Poet of Wales – Hanan Issa

== Events ==
=== January ===
- 1 January
  - Blood bike volunteer Andrew Rogers, of Haycastle, Pembrokeshire, dies in hospital from injuries sustained after his motorcycle was involved in a crash with another vehicle on the A48 on 29 December.
  - The mystery runner in the Nos Galan road race is Jess Fishlock.
- 4 January – Snow and ice prompt the closure of 30 schools due to return the following day from the Christmas holiday.
- 5 January
  - Snow and ice warnings are issued for Tuesday 6 January as the cold snap continues.
  - Jonathan Carley is fined £500 after admitting dressing as a Royal Navy admiral at a Remembrance Sunday event in Llandudno in November 2024 without having permission to wear the uniform.
- 7 January – At a hearing at Mold Crown Court, Miles Cross, who sold chemicals online to help people commit suicide, is sentenced to 14 years in prison.
- 8 January – Storm Goretti: An amber weather warning comes into force as heavy snow falls in Wales, with warnings of potential avalanches in places.
- 9 January – The impact of Storm Goretti continues with warnings for ice, fog and wintry showers in place until midday on Saturday 10 December.
- 11 January – Archaeologists discover the remains of a large Roman villa at Margam Country Park near Port Talbot.
- 12 January – Rhydian Lynne Rhys Jamieson, who tried to kill his baby daughter by throwing her at a television and causing her serious injuries, is sentenced to 35 years in prison.
- 20 January
  - Member of the Senedd and shadow cabinet James Evans is expelled from the Welsh Conservatives after telling leader Darren Millar he is involved in talks to join Reform UK. Reform's leader, Nigel Farage, later says he has held no such talks with Evans.
  - A dead nest belonging to the invasive Asian hornet species has been found near Wrexham, and is the first confirmed presence of the hornets in Wales.
  - Demolition begins on Coney Beach Amusement Park, which closed in October after more than a century in operation.
- 21 January – A photographer has captured a rare orange cephalopod octopus on a beach at Tenby, Pembrokeshire.
- 22 January
  - A coroner's inquest urges better signage at an area of the Brecon Beacons known as Waterfall Country following the deaths of three people there during two separate incidents.
  - Flintshire County Council gets its first Reform UK councillor, following a by-election in the Leeswood ward.
- 23 January – At a hearing at Newport Crown Court, Richard Downey, aged 55, is sentenced to eight years in prison for a sexual assault committed against a 13-year-old schoolgirl in September 1997. The conviction was secured following advances in DNA technology.
- 27 January – The Senedd votes to approve the 2026 Welsh budget, worth £27bn, following a deal between Labour and Plaid Cymru.
- 29 January – A road tunnel on the A55 at Conwy is closed following a collision between a car and a heavy goods vehicle in which a woman is killed.
- 30 January
  - Following a trial at Cardiff Crown Court, Jordan Mills-Smith, Joshua Gordon, Melissa Quailey-Dashper and Kristina Ginova, are found guilty of the murder of Joanne Penney, who was shot dead when she answered the door of a flat she was visiting in Talbot Green in March 2025. A fifth defendant, Marcus Huntley, pleaded guilty to murder earlier in the trial. The five will be sentenced at a later date.
  - Cardiff City Council votes to use only silent or low noise fireworks at future displays in order to protect pets and children.

=== February ===
- 1 February – The Met Office issues a severe weather alert for icy conditions overnight for 1–2 February as temperatures are forecast to drop significantly.
- 3 February – The Senedd approves Welsh Government proposals to increase the minimum unit price of alcohol by 30%, from 50p to 65p, from October.
- 5 February
  - A 15-year-old boy is arrested on suspicion of attempted murder after a teacher was injured in an incident at Milford Haven Comprehensive School in Pembrokeshire.
  - Former Conservative Party councillor Dan Thomas is appointed as Leader of Reform UK Wales, while it is confirmed that Senedd Member James Evans has joined the party after being expelled from the Conservatives.
  - Reform UK win their first council seat in Anglesey, in a local by-election in the Ynys Gybi ward, marking their first gain from Plaid Cymru.
  - Gwent Police begin a murder investigation following the death of a 17-year-old boy, subsequently named as Tristan Shae Kerr, in Caerphilly.
- 7 February – A 15-year-old boy is remanded in youth detention by magistrates at Swansea charged with the attempted murder of a teacher in Milford Haven.
- 9 February – Firefighters attend a large blaze at an industrial estate in Caerphilly County.
- 10 February
  - Following a trial at Swansea Crown Court, Thomas Morgan is convicted of the murder of his partner's five-month-old baby in March 2024 after the child suffered catastrophic brain injuries as a result of being violently shaken.
  - Bangor University's Debating and Political Society refuses a request for a question and answer session from Reform UK campaigner Jack Anderton and MP Sarah Pochin, citing "zero tolerance for any form of racism, transphobia or homophobia displayed by the members of Reform". The university distances itself from the decision.
- 11 February – Reform UK's Francesca O'Brien says the party will not defund Bangor University after the party's Head of Policy, Zia Yusuf, suggested they would remove £30m of funding from the university after its debating society rejected a request for a Q&A session by two Reform politicians.
- 12 February – Two senior parliamentary aides to Welsh Conservatives leader Darren Millar – former deputy chief of staff Zak Weaver and senior communications officer Tomos Llewelyn – defect to Reform UK on the eve of the Welsh Conservative Party conference in Llandudno.
- 17 February – A man is arrested following the discovery of an elderly woman's body in a freezer at an address in Porthcawl.
- 18 February
  - Prime Minister Keir Starmer announces £14bn of government investment in Welsh railways.
  - A yellow weather warning for snow and ice is issued for 18 of Wales's 22 counties, which is in force until 10am on Thursday 19 February.
- 19 February
  - Data from NHS Wales indicates that hospital waiting lists in Wales are at their lowest for three years, with 741,000 recorded patient pathways as of December 2025, compared to 734,721 in March 2023.
  - The Democracy and Boundary Commission Cymru approves a 6.4% pay increase for local councillors in Wales, taking their basic annual salary to £21,044.
  - Rescuers recover the bodies of two men who went missing on Snowdon the previous day.
- 20 February – Two teenagers are sentenced to life imprisonment for the murder of Kamran Aman, who was fatally stabbed in a racially-motivated attack as he delivered groceries to his home in Barry.
- 23 February – Plans are announced for the construction of a new £33m hospital unit at the Royal Alexandra Hospital in Rhyl in order to improve NHS services in north Wales.
- 24 February – The Senedd votes to give its approval to the provision of assisted dying services in Wales.
- 25 February – Thomas Morgan is sentenced to life imprisonment with a minimum of 19 years for the murder of five-month-old Jensen-Lee Dougal, who died after being violently shaken in March 2024.
- 26 February – A Church in Wales report reveals that allegations of sexual assault against bishop Anthony Pierce when he was a vicar were covered up, allowing him to rise through the ranks.
- 27 February – Swansea Council begins legal proceedings against the Welsh Rugby Union to prevent it selling Cardiff Rugby to Y11 Sport & Media.

=== March ===
- 2 March – Gwynedd Council planning committee grant approval for 15 new affordable homes in Trefor. They reject as "unlawful" the demands from the local community council that the homes should be reserved exclusively for Welsh speakers.
- 3 March – Stradey Park Hotel in Llanelli, Carmarthenshire, which was at the centre of Home Office plans to be used to house 100 asylum seekers, closes with immediate effect.
- 4 March – An inquest into the deaths of two sisters who drowned while paddling at Snowdonia National Park in June 2025 records a verdict of accidental death.
- 6 March – At a hearing at Bristol Crown Court, Shazad Ali, who posted several hundred ISIS propaganda videos online and boasted of becoming the group's next spokesman in Wales, is sentenced to five years in prison.
- 10 March – Reform UK Senedd member Laura Anne Jones is criticised for a speech in which she claimed rival parties had "entertained" the idea of children self-identifying as cats.
- 12 March – Plans to build a 50-storey skyscraper in Cardiff, which would become Wales's tallest building, are approved.
- 13 March – At a hearing at Cardiff Crown Court, Alireza Askari, who previously pleaded guilty to the murder of his wife Paria Veisi, who he stabbed to death then buried in their back garden, is sentenced to life imprisonment with a minimum term of 26 years.
- 17 March
  - Senedd members vote 39–10 to ban greyhound racing in Wales, but the legislation could face a legal challenge after it emerges civil servants warned there was not enough evidence to justify a ban.
  - The Senedd votes to make it illegal to lie during election campaigns, with the legislation expected to become law in 2030.
- 18 March – Police confiscate more than £20,000 worth of assets belonging to Daniel Andreas San Diego, who is scheduled to be deported to the United States to face terrorism charges.
- 19 March
  - Nigel Farage is criticised by rival parties for describing Welsh people as "foreign speakers" in a paid for video.
  - Alan and Bernita Davies, who let their emaciated daughter die in her ground-floor bedroom, which was in an "appalling" state, are each sentenced to eight years in prison.
- 20 March – The High Court rejects a legal challenge brought by the Greyhound Board of Great Britain over legislation banning greyhound racing in Wales.
- 25 March
  - At a hearing at Mold Crown Court, teenager Tristan Roberts is sentenced to life imprisonment with a minimum term of 22 and a half years for the murder of his mother, Angela Shellis, who he beat to death with a hammer in October 2025. Roberts had pleaded guilty to the murder at an earlier hearing.
  - Reform UK candidate Andrew Barry withdraws from the 2026 Senedd election and quits the party over party anger about "parachuting" candidates into seats and the number of defections from the Conservatives.
- 27 March – Corey Edwards, a leading candidate for Reform UK in the forthcoming Senedd election, withdraws his candidacy after a photograph emerged appearing to show him performing a Nazi salute.
- 29 March – Dyfed-Powys Police refers itself to the Independent Office for Police Conduct after an armed officer discharged a shot when police were called to a housing estate in Milford Haven, Pembrokeshire, the previous evening, amid reports of a man with a knife.
- 30 March – Eluned Morgan launches the Welsh Labour manifesto for the 2026 Senedd election at an event in Swansea.
- 31 March – It is announced that three Reform UK candidates to represent the Vale of Glamorgan in the Senedd have withdrawn their candidacy.

=== April ===
- 2 April
  - Plaid Cymru candidate Vivek Thuppil, who described Israel as a "terrorist state" on social media, will remain available for selection in the 2026 Senedd election, the party confirms.
  - Data from NHS Wales indicates the backlog of major repairs on NHS properties in Wales has almost reached £1bn.
- 10 April – Senedd members Rhys ab Owen and Russell George, who were expelled from Plaid Cymru and the Welsh Conservatives respectively, confirm they will run in the 2026 Senedd election as independents.
- 12 April – The National Bee Unit is to set traps around a site where a dead nest belonging to Asian hornets, an invasive species of wasp that poses a risk to honey bees, was discovered in January.
- 13 April
  - The UK government approves plans to build a new nuclear power station at Wylfa on the Isle of Anglesey.
  - The Welsh Rugby Union holds an extraordinary general meeting which confirms their plans to cut the number of professional clubs from four to three. They would also look to replace chair Richard Collier-Keywood, who had resigned after pressure from Central Glamorgan Rugby Union.
- 14 April – The Welsh Liberal Democrats unveil their manifesto for the Senedd election.
- 16 April – The Governing Body of the Church in Wales votes to approve a bill making the blessing of same-sex marriages permanent.
- 24 April – Reform Wales leader Dan Thomas distances himself from online comments made by Senedd candidate Martin Roberts that "abuse in nurseries will skyrocket" if parents receive more free childcare.
- 25 April – A bronze statue of comedian Terry Jones is unveiled in his birthplace of Colwyn Bay.
- 26 April
  - Firefighters are called to Newport Docks to tackle a fire on a ship carrying 1,000 tonnes of scrap metal.
  - Independent councillor Janet Cleverly, who told a council call handler to "speak English", has been reprimanded following an ombudsman investigation, and must complete extra training.
  - Hollywood actor Hans Obma is to join the cast of Welsh soap Pobl y Cwm after learning to speak the Welsh language.
- 26 April – Firefighters from Mid and West Wales Fire and Rescue Service begin tackling a series of wildfires in and around the Elan Valley area.
- 29 April – Nigel Farage says prominent Reform member Arron Banks should apologise over online comments that sparked accusations of racism after he posted a video in response to a Plaid Cymru video of a black community organiser from Cardiff.

=== May ===
- 1 May
  - Following a trial at Cardiff Crown Court, teenager Kian Bateman is found guilty of the murder of a woman whom he deliberately hit with his car outside a nightclub in September 2025, after inhaling laughing gas.
  - Cardiff University is fined £280,000 after two members of staff developed asthma after being exposed to animal allergens while working in laboratories.
- 2 May – Wales Green Party leader Anthony Slaughter says he would form a coalition with other parties to stop Reform UK getting into government.
- 4 May – Cardiff Council is urgently investigating reports that some people who applied for postal votes have not received the documentation through the post.
- 5 May – A part-time cleaner who was dismissed by Aberystwyth University after being accused of buying a student a rice cooker, an item banned by the university, wins more than £260,000 in compensation at tribunal.
- 6 May
  - Singer Bonnie Tyler is rushed into hospital for emergency intestinal surgery.
  - More than 1,300 postal vote applicants in Cardiff have not received their ballot papers through the post, it is confirmed.
- 7 May
  - 2026 Senedd election, the first for an enlarged 96-seat parliament and the first by party-list proportional representation.
  - A spokesman for singer Bonnie Tyler says she has been placed in an induced coma to aid her recovery following intestinal surgery.
- 8 May – The results of the 2026 Senedd election are announced. Plaid Cymru becomes the biggest party in the new Senedd, with Reform UK the second largest. No party has an overall majority.
- 9 May – The proclamation of the 2027 Maldwyn Meirionnydd National Eisteddfod takes place in Llanidloes, Powys.
- 12 May
  - Rhun ap Iorwerth is sworn in as First Minister of Wales, becoming the first First Minister to come from a party other than Welsh Labour.
  - Huw Irranca-Davies is elected as the new Llywydd of the Senedd, receiving 85 of the 95 votes.
- 13 May
  - The Ap Iorwerth government is formed with new ministers appointed to the Welsh Cabinet.
  - Former MS Caroline Jones is reported to be receiving palliative care after being diagnosed with severe sepsis.
- 14 May – The Welsh Government says that UK Prime Minister Keir Starmer has spoken to First Minister Rhun ap Iorwerth, and said he is open to giving the Senedd more lawmaking powers. Ap Iorwerth later confirms he raised the topic of Welsh independence on the call.
- 19 May – Dozens of bodies found by archaeologists at the site of the former Cardigan Memorial Hospital are described as a "significant" and "unexpected" discovery.
- 21 May – The Hay Festival takes place in Hay-on-Wye from 21–31 May.
- 23 May – A 16-day period of engineering work begins on the Severn Tunnel to replace overhead power lines on one of the UK's busiest train routes, causing disruption to services between England and South Wales.
- 23–29 May – The 2026 Urdd National Eisteddfod takes place at the Anglesey Showground near Gwalchmai.
- 26 May
  - First Minister Rhun ap Iorwerth confirms there will be no Wales-wide ban on mobile phones in schools.
  - Corey Edwards, a Senedd candidate who stood down after appearing to perform a Nazi salute, is taken on as an adviser by Reform Wales leader Dan Thomas.
  - Wales records its hottest May day temperature, with a high of 32.9 °C in Bute Park, Cardiff.
- 27 May – May 2026 United Kingdom heatwave: The Met Office issues a yellow weather warning for thunderstorms across Wales.
- 28 May – Following a trial at Cardiff Crown Court, Renaldo Baptiste is convicted of orchestrating the March 2025 murder of Joanne Penney in Talbot Green from his prison cell after using an illegal mobile phone to arrange the supply of the gun that was used to kill her.

=== June ===
- 3 June – A major fire breaks out on the processing line at Tata Steel's Port Talbot steelworks, continuing to burn until the following day.
- 5 June – The Court of Appeal rejects an application by Nerys Bethan Lloyd, a paddleboard company owner who caused the deaths of four people in 2021, to have her prison sentence reduced.
- 10 June
  - Eryri National Park Authority says it will pause a ban on overnight parking in its car parks after problems with anti-social behaviour became worse following the ban in March.
  - St Mary's Church, Beddgelert is voted "best place in the world" in a Reddit poll.
- 13 June – Welsh people named by King Charles III of the United Kingdom in the 2026 Birthday Honours include Jessica Morden, MP (DBE) and Heather Stevens, philanthropist, Professor Ann John (OBE) and singer and broadcaster Cerys Matthews (OBE)
- 15 June – A spokesperson for Bonnie Tyler says that the singer is out of a coma, but remains very ill in intensive care.
- 16 June –
  - Education Minister Anna Brychan announces that guidelines will be drawn up for the use of mobile phones in Welsh schools, with headteachers strongly encouraged to restrict their use.
  - Plaid Cymru accuses Reform politician Joe Martin of inflammatory and dangerous rhetoric after he claimed attacks from Sudanese asylum seekers were "inevitable".
  - Three people from south Wales have been arrested following the seizure of £139m worth of cannabis on 6 May.
- 17 June – Senedd members from Plaid Cymru, Labour and the Greens walk out as Reform's Joe Martin gives a speech in which he said that Welsh students are unable to read, and that Indian nurses are taking Welsh jobs.
- 18 June
  - The Welsh Government expresses its disappointment that a planned meeting between First Minister Rhun ap Iorwerth and Prime Minister Keir Starmer, scheduled for June, will not take place.
  - An investigation by the Rail Accident Investigation Branch concludes that the 2024 Taleddig train collision would not have happened if one or both of the automatic and manual sanding systems, which increase wheel adhesion to the track, had been activated.
- 19 June – Thirty people are sentenced to prison for their part in the 2023 Ely riot.
- 20 June – Chepstow's 210-year-old Wye Bridge, which links Wales with England, reopens to pedestrians, but will need to close again if the weather gets too hot or too cold. The bridge was closed in October 2025 after cracks appeared in its structure.
- 23 June –
  - Nineteen people are injured, with six of them taken to hospital, after a bus overturns during a crash on a roundabout on the A484 in Carmarthenshire.
  - A 14-year-old boy is arrested on suspicion of murder following the disappearance of a 14-year-old girl in Blaenau, Gwent, on 20 June, and the subsequent discovery of a body.
- 24 June
  - Marcus Huntley, Jordan Mills-Smith, Joshua Gordon, Melissa Quailey-Dashper, Kristina Ginova, and Renaldo Baptiste, are sentenced to life imprisonment for the March 2025 murder of Joanne Penney, who was shot through the head at the door of a friend's property in Talbot Green.
  - The Welsh Government announces plans for automatic voter registration in time for the 2027 local elections.
- 25 June – 2026 United Kingdom heatwaves: Wales records its hottest June temperature, as well as its highest of the year, after 35.9 °C is recorded in Bute Park, Cardiff.
- 26 June
  - A 14-year-old boy appears in court charged with murder after a body was found during the search for a girl missing since 20 June.
  - Two people are rescued after a light aircraft they were travelling in makes an emergency landing off the coast of Pembrokeshire.
- 27 June – The Taith Yr Arglwydd Rhys ('Journey of Lord Rhys') concludes in Cardigan after travelling through Pembrokeshire in advance of the Eisteddfod y Garreg Las. The National Eisteddfod Chair and Crown also arrive in the town.
- 28 June – A man is arrested following the death of another man in a street in Welshpool in the early hours of the morning.
- 30 June
  - The Welsh Government announces plans for a new bus service linking north and south Wales, with the five-hour journey forecast to be quicker than current rail journeys. Eight coaches have been purchased for the route, which plans to launch in the autumn.
  - Wales's largest health board, Betsi Cadwaladr University Health Board, which has been in special measures for nine years, is given a "final chance" to improve.
  - An 18-year-old dies during a Duke of Edinburgh Award expedition after entering the River Wye at Glasbury.

=== July ===
- 1 July
  - A Reform Wales proposal to scrap the Welsh Government's Nation of Sanctuary policy for asylum seekers is defeated in a Senedd vote 38–52.
  - A Pembrokeshire couple is given permission by their local authority to breed guinea pigs on their land so they can eat them as part of a sustainable lifestyle.
- 6 July – A 75-year-old woman from Cwmbran is killed after being run over by her own car while stopping to rescue a cat.
- 7 July – The Llangollen International Eisteddfod takes place from 7 to 12 July in Llangollen, Denbighshire.
- 9 July
  - The winners of the Wales Book of the Year awards are announced at a ceremony in Caernarfon.
  - An 18-year-old is arrested on suspicion of murder after a man died following a crash involving a car and an off-road bike in Swansea.
- 10 July
  - Emma Gardner, a Detective Inspector with North Wales Police, is found guilty of unauthorised access of a police database to gather information for a close friend. She will be sentenced in September.
  - A further three arrests are made following the death of an 18-year-old man in a crash in Swansea.
- 11 July
  - Gwent Police shot and wounded a man, believed to be carrying a crossbow, after being called to an address in Newport the previous evening.
  - A teenager is charged with murder following a fatal crash between a car and an off-road bike in Swansea.
- 12 July – 2026 United Kingdom heatwaves: Emergency services declare a major incident over a large wildfire on Conwy Mountain, on the edge of Snowdonia in north Wales, prompting the evacuation of nearby residents. Firefighters also tackle wildfires elsewhere across England and Wales amid the ongoing heatwave.
- 15 July
  - The Welsh Government's budget is defeated in the Senedd by 49 votes to 44. First Minister Rhun ap Iorwerth promises an "even more cooperative" approach to working with opposition parties.
  - 2026 Welsh Labour leadership election: Ken Skates officially becomes permanent leader of Welsh Labour unopposed; he was previously appointed interim leader on 9 May.
- 17 July
  - Cardiff businesswoman Rupali Wagh, who fraudulently claimed £200,000 in Covid financial support then invested the money in stocks and shares, as well as clearing off credit card debts, is sentenced to two years in prison.
  - Police are reported to be investigating an alleged death threat against Reform UK MS Cai Parry-Jones and his family.
- 18 July – Police launch a murder investigation following the death of a woman, subsequently named as Charlene Dowsall, whose body was found in a street a short distance from where an altercation took place in Newport. A man is subsequently charged over the death.
- 19 July
  - 2026 United Kingdom heatwaves: A temporary hosepipe ban comes into force for parts of Pembrokeshire, Carmarthenshire and Ceredigion.
  - 2026 United Kingdom heatwaves: A wildfire breaks out on a mountainside near Blaenavon and continues to burn for a number of days
- 21 July –
  - Stephen Kinnock is appointed as Secretary of State for Wales in Andy Burnham's new cabinet, replacing Jo Stevens.
  - Former Carmarthen MP Gwynoro Jones is found not guilt of sexual assault.
- 22 July
  - 2026 United Kingdom heatwaves: The Welsh Government activates "crisis management arrangements" due to the number of wildfires across Wales.
  - Natural Resources Wales declares drought in certain areas.
  - A fire breaks out at the Awel Y Mor Primary School in Port Talbot.
  - Police arrest a suspect in connection with the death of 92-year-old Bentley Mathias, who died at Morriston Hospital in November 1991. The death was originally recorded as due to brain haemorrhage, but a murder investigation was launched following the emergence of potential new evidence.
- 23 July
  - 2026 United Kingdom heatwaves: Natural Resources Wales declares parts of north Wales and the Upper Severn to be in drought, while all remaining Welsh catchments are placed under prolonged dry weather status. July is on course to become the driest recorded in Wales for almost 190 years, following successive heatwaves, widespread wildfires and exceptionally low river levels.
  - Prime Minister Andy Burnham has a face-to-face meeting with the First Minister of Wales, Rhun ap Iorwerth, in Glasgow ahead of the 2026 Commonwealth Games opening ceremony.
- 26 July – A large fire breaks out at a scrapyard in Talacre, Flintshire.
- 27 July – The Menai Suspension Bridge is closed after abuse and harassment of traffic management workers by the public. The bridge re-opens the following day.
- 30 July
  - 2026 United Kingdom heatwaves: A drought is declared across the whole of Wales, with the country on course to experience its driest July for 190 years.
  - Following the sound of a loud explosion from a nearby quarry, the village of Gwaelod-y-Garth near Cardiff is flooded by up to 5 feet of water. No explanation of the cause is forthcoming.

=== August ===
- 1 August – The National Eisteddfod of Wales opens in Llantood, Pembrokeshire. It will continue until 8 August.
- 2 August – A 19th century toll house with links to the Rebecca Riots in Llannon, near Llanelli, sells at auction for £76,000.
- 3 August – The Football Association of Wales withdraws its support for Gianni Infantino's re-election as president of FIFA (the English Football Association prepares to follow) amid controversy surrounding the abandoned FIFA Forward Enterprise proposal.
- 4 August – Following the success of Martin Huws in being awarded the Crown at the National Eisteddfod, it is revealed that one of the losing contestants was Huw Edwards.
- 6 August – After the judges of the Gwobr Goffa Daniel Owen at the National Eisteddfod suggest that AI may have been used to write one of the less successful entries, an author from Cardiff who had never written in the Welsh language before says that she produced it without assistance and was "devastated" by the judgment. The judges, Meinir Wyn Edwards, Llwyd Owen and Lleucu Roberts, apologise for any distress caused.
- 7 August – Poet Emyr Lewis is named as winner of the National Eisteddfod of Wales Chair, the second time he has received the award.
- 9 August – It is revealed that fans of the Harry Potter film series succeeded in diverting the £430m Greenlink submarine power cable between County Wexford and Pembrokeshire after a campaign in which they complained it would disturb a memorial to Dobby the elf, a character from the series whose death was portrayed on a beach in Pembrokeshire.
- 12 August – Several houses are destroyed by fire in Newbridge, Caerphilly County Borough, and residents of 32 properties are evacuated. The following day a woman is arrested on suspicion of arson.
- 14 August
  - The UK government deploys 100 army personnel, initially to South Wales, to help tackle wildfires.
  - A light aircraft on route to Caernarfon Airport crashes near Trawsfynydd, north Wales, killing the two people on board.
  - A UK emergency alert (about the threat of wildfires) is sent to mobile phones in Wales in Welsh first, attracting criticism from Conservative and Reform politicians.
- 15 August – The late Bonnie Tyler's body is brought back to her home in Mumbles, Swansea, through streets lined by thousands of emotional fans.
- 17 August – A funeral service celebrating the life of Bonnie Tyler is held in Swansea, and livestreamed to fans worldwide via her website.
- 18 August – The Grade II* listed John Nash manor in the Neath Valley, Rheola House, is destroyed by fire. Four teenagers are later arrested under suspicion of arson.
- 19 August – Jules and Bob Rogers, two councillors with Pontypool Community Council, lose their seats after not turning up to meetings for six months.
- 20 August – The four-day Green Man Festival begins in the Brecon Beacons, though without the burning of a large Green Man as part of the closing ceremony because of the risk of wildfires.
- 21 August – Horses that have been allowed to graze on Rhossili Common on the Gower peninsula for more than 100 years, are removed by their owners. This is blamed on "pressure" from the landowners, National Trust Cymru, about grazing rights.
- 22 August – Save the Children express concern about data that shows Torfaen has one of the world's highest carbon emissions per square kilometre as a result of wildfires in July.
- 27 August – UK Prime Minister Andy Burnham makes his first official visit to Wales, to Port Talbot, accompanied by Secretary of State for Wales (and local MP) Stephen Kinnock.
- 29 August – The Welsh Gender Service pauses scheduled and new referrals for gender-reassignment surgeries over "concerns" about the number of referrals being made.

=== September ===
- 1 September – Craig Henton, a predatory paedophile who abused a young girl and used social media apps to plan the abuse of other children, is sentenced to 21 years in prison at a hearing at Swansea Crown Court.
- 3 September –
  - A 16-year-old boy is sentenced to four-and-a-half years in youth detention for stabbing a teacher in the head with a kitchen knife at Milford Haven Comprehensive School in February.
  - Nathan Gill, the former leader of Reform Wales, is ordered to pay £22,500 after accepting bribes to ask pro-Russia questions in the European Parliament.
- 14 September – With the governments of Scotland, Wales and Northern Ireland all led by nationalist parties for the first time, the leaders of the SNP, Plaid Cymru and Sinn Féin meet in Cardiff, signing a agreement which says "No Westminster government has the right to block democracy or undermine the principle that our people will decide their own future."
- 15 September
  - Welsh actor Matthew Rhys wins two Best Actor awards at the US Emmy Awards, the first actor to do so in the same evening. He dedicates his second award to the "good people of Wales".
  - Dan Thomas resigns as leader of Reform UK in Wales and leader of the opposition in the Senedd following an arrest on suspicion of assault, Helen Jenner as deputy became the acting leader. Thomas avoids suspension.
  - Sarah Cooper-Lesadd, Senedd Member for Pen-y-Bont Bro Morgannwg defects from Reform UK to Plaid Cymru.
- 18 September – Actor Michael Sheen meets with First Minister, Rhyn ap Iorwerth, about toxic chemical dumping in Wales. This follows the broadcast of Sheen's investigative BBC television series, Buried with Michael Sheen, in August.
- 21 September
  - Nigel Farage announces the new leader of Reform UK Wales, Helen Jenner, following a leadership vote amongst the 33 Reform members of the Senedd.
  - Steve Hunt resigns as leader of Neath Port Talbot Council following allegations he drank a whole bottle of gin at a Welsh Local Government Association conference and threatened to "wipe out" Plaid Cymru. A new council leader will be appointed on 14 October.
  - Wrexham football club announce that their owners, Ryan Reynolds and Rob Mac, have bought The Turf, a pub next door to the football ground. The club said it hoped to "help protect the historic pub".
- 22 September
  - Laura Anne Jones is elected as deputy leader of Reform Wales.
  - Flintshire Council approves an application for the village of Northop Hall to adopt the Welsh name Pentre Moch – meaning Pigs Village – in honour of the 7th century village that Northop Hall grew from.
  - Wales Today weather presenter Derek Brockway confirms he will leave the programme after 30 years, with his final broadcast being at the end of the year.
- 23 September
  - A Royal Air Force Hawk T2 fighter jet crashes near RAF Valley on Anglesey. Both pilots manage to eject safely.
  - Tŷ Hyll (The Ugly House), a tourist attraction between Betws-y-Coed and Capel Curig, goes up for auction. Bids reach £219,000 but it fails to reach the seller's reserve. The current tearoom owner confirms she is leaving regardless.
- 24 September – Senedd members narrowly vote to reject a motion declaring that Wales should remain as part of the UK; the motion is split 45–45, with the Presiding Officer casting a vote against it.
- 25 September
  - Prime Minister Andy Burnham rules out handing the Senedd powers to call a referendum on Welsh independence.
  - Dyfed-Powys Police confirm they have been the victim of a cyberattack which may have compromised staff information.
- 26 September
  - A march for Wales independence takes place in Aberystwyth, and is attended by First Minister Rhun ap Iorwerth.
  - A 'welcome festival' takes place in Newport for the 2027 Urdd National Eisteddfod. Hundreds of children and families parade through the city, finishing in John Frost Square.
- 28 September – Ferry passengers travelling between ports in Wales and the Republic of Ireland must now show a valid passport before boarding, having not been required to previously.
- 29 September
  - North Wales Police issue an appeal for the mother of a newborn baby found dead on the shoreline of the Menai Strait two days earlier.
  - Visitors to Prince Philip Hospital, Llanelli are restricted, and two wards closed, following an outbreak of scabies.
- 30 September – Port Talbot solicitor Ben Garvey is sentenced to three years in prison after he became involved in supplying cocaine for a client.

=== October ===
- 2 October – Police say a man arrested in 2025 in connection with the 1993 murders of Harry and Megan Tooze is no longer a suspect, and will face no further investigation.
- 4 October – The body of a woman is found in a burning van in Prestatyn. A 38-year old man is arrested on suspicion of murder.
- 6 October – Deputy leader of the Wales Green Party, Phil Davies, announces he has left the party after a motion to declare "Zionism is racism" is passed at the 2026 Green Party Conference.
- 10 October
  - Hundreds demonstrate in Caernarvon against plans for a data centre complex, proposed for a site between Caernarfon and Y Felinheli.
  - A maintenance worker who was left with lifechanging injuries after falling from an electricity pylon after he was not properly secured to the structure is awarded £10m in damages by the Health and Safety Executive.
- 13 October – Plaid Cymru and Welsh Labour agree a deal to provide a further £60m for the education of children with additional needs to secure Labour's support for the Welsh Government's mini-budget, which failed to pass the Senedd in the summer.
- 15 October – King Charles and Queen Camilla officially open the seventh session of the Senedd during which the King gives a speech praising the people of Wales's "sense of belonging". A poetry reading by Wales' national poet, Hanan Issa, is cancelled because her specially written poem, "To Grow", which makes reference to Gaza and transgender issues, is deemed to be "not the right fit".
- 19 October – Prime Minister Andy Burnham visits Aberfan ahead of the 60th anniversary of the 1966 disaster.
- 20 October – Efa Gruffudd Jones resigns as Welsh Language Commissioner, citing "personal reasons".
- 21 October – King Charles, Queen Camilla and Prince William join survivors of the Aberfan disaster for a ceremony on the 60th anniversary of the disaster.
- 22 October – The first named storm of the autumn, Storm Austen, brings strong winds to west and north Wales, and power cuts to many homes.
- 23 October – Jamie Miller becomes the first Welsh musician in 15 years (and the first solo male for 41 years) to top the UK singles chart, with Babydoll.
- 28 October – Following the 2026 UK Budget, Chancellor John Healey pledges an additional £450 million to Wales over 3 years for public services. The Wales Finance Minister says this is a real-term cut, but she says she will match the £100 household energy payment to Welsh households, which had been promised to households in England.
- 31 October – Cate McHugh from Llantwit Major, Vale of Glamorgan, wins ITV's The Voice UK, coached by Sir Tom Jones who was appearing for the last time as a coach on the series.

=== November ===
- 3 November – The Plaid Cymru Welsh Government mini budget is passed in the Senedd, four months after the first attempt was defeated. Plaid Cymru and Welsh Labour came to an agreement to vote for the proposals.
- 7 November – It is announced that the archaeological remains of a "very significant" Roman settlement have been found under a new-build housing estate in Mancot, Flintshire.
- 10 November
  - The Welsh Government announces the establishment of the National Commission for Wales, a new body that will examine the case for Welsh independence as well as greater devolved powers for the Senedd.
  - Reform Wales MS Joe Martin is banned from speaking in the Senedd until he apologises for saying that white people are being replaced in the UK.
  - ITV Wales announces plans to axe its Coast and Country and Backstage programmes, as well as reducing the number of production staff, in order to cut costs.
- 11 November
  - Reform Wales boycotts much of the day's Senedd proceedings over the banning of its MS Joe Martin.
  - The Welsh Government announces that the threshold at which student loans must start to be repaid will be frozen at £29,385 between 2027 and 2030, rather than rising with inflation.
- 17 November – The Plaid Cymru Welsh Government publishes its first Draft Budget, for 2027–2028.
- 18 November – Reform Wales withdraws its plans for a Senedd debate on freedom of speech as its boycott of the chamber continues.
- 19 November – A red carpet event takes place at Cineworld, Cardiff, for the first showing of the Welsh language dub of Star Wars: A New Hope.
- 20 November – Prime Minister Andy Burnham writes to First Minister of Wales Rhun ap Iorwerth to say he is "not persuaded" by the case to devolve responsibilities over policing and justice, the Crown Estate and rail infrastructure to Wales.
- 21 November – A stranded dolphin, at Broughton Bay on the Gower peninsula, is given first aid by British Divers Marine Life Rescue and successfully returned to the sea.

=== Predicted and scheduled ===
- December – 2026 Wales Green Party leadership election
- 25 December – Star Wars: A New Hope, dubbed into Welsh for the first time and called Star Wars: Gobaith Newydd, will be broadcast on S4C.

== Sport ==
- 14 March – Wales win their first Six Nations rugby union match for over 3-years, against Italy in Cardiff, but still win the Wooden Spoon for the third year in a row.
- 28 June–11 July – 2026 UEFA European Under-19 Championship
- 28 July – Gymnast Ruby Evans wins Wales' first gold medal at the 2026 Commonwealth Games after winning the floor final.
- 17 August – With three Welsh football teams (Cardiff, Swansea, Wrexham) now playing in the EFL Championship, the first league game of the 2026–27 season sees Cardiff City playing Wrexham for the first time since 2002. Cardiff scores a 98th-minute equaliser to draw 1–1.
- 25 August – Footballer Noah Anyadike, at 15 years and 98 days old, becomes the youngest player ever to play in the EFL Cup (and Cardiff City's youngest player) when he plays for Cardiff against Norwich City at the Cardiff City Stadium.
- 6 September – Welsh snooker player, Jak Jones, wins the final of the British Open snooker tournament, his second ranking title.
- 4 October – Elfyn Evans of Dolgellau becomes Britain's first rally world champion since 2001.
- 14 November – The Wales men's national rugby union team beat the All Blacks at the Principality Stadium in the Nations Championship, the first time Wales has beaten New Zealand since 1953.
- 11 December – Tyson Fury and Anthony Joshua are set to contest the all-British boxing heavyweight title at Cardiff's Principality Stadium.

== Arts and culture ==
=== National Eisteddfod of Wales ===
- Crown: Martin Huws
- Chair: Emyr Lewis
- Drama Medal: Melda Lois Griffiths & Mirain Alaw Jones
- Prose Medal: Gareth Evans-Jones
- Gwobr Goffa Daniel Owen: Rebecca Thomas, Ynys Gwales

=== Urdd National Eisteddfod ===
- Chair: Lois Medi
- Crown: Elin Undeg Williams

=== Books ===
- Scribblertown – Mary Burdett-Jones
- An Atheist Christian Gunslinger – Jerry Hunter

==== Wales Book of the Year ====
- English language winner: A Room Above a Shop – Anthony Shapland
- Welsh language winner: Mae – Mererid Hopwood

=== Film ===
- Effi o Blaenau – UK release 19 June
- Black Church Bay – UK premiere 15 October
- Star Wars: Gobaith Newydd – A dubbed version of Star Wars, to be broadcast on S4C on 25 December.

=== Music ===
- An Act of Piracy (opera) by Richard Parry
- Huw Watkins – Concerto for Orchestra / Fanfare for the Hallé / Symphony No. 2 (first recordings)

==== Welsh Music Prize ====
- Dafydd Owain for his album Ymarfer Byw

=== Radio ===
- 7 September – Launch of The Big Welsh Breakfast on Nation Radio Wales, presented by Phil Hoyles and Angela Jay.
- 22 September – Roy Noble announces he will step down from his BBC Radio Wales Sunday show in March 2027.

== Holidays ==
- 1 January – New Year's Day
- 3 April – Good Friday
- 6 April – Easter Monday
- 4 May – Early May bank holiday
- 25 May – Spring May Bank Holiday
- 31 August – Summer Bank Holiday
- 25 December – Christmas Day
- 26 December – Boxing Day

== Deaths ==
- 2 January – Molly Parkin, 93, painter, novelist and journalist
- 8 January – Terry Yorath, 75, former footballer and manager
- Between 1 and 17 January – Paul Grist, 86, actor
- 1 February – Tony Jones, 86, singer (Tony ac Aloma)
- 28 February – Annabel Schofield, 62, Welsh-born American model and actress (Dallas), brain cancer.
- 4 March – Ray Glastonbury, 87, rugby union (Cardiff) and league (Workington Town, national team) player. (death announced on this date)
- 6 March – Eigra Lewis Roberts, 86, writer, playwright, poet and Eisteddfod winner. (death announced on this date)
- 13 March
  - Phil Campbell, 64, guitarist (Motörhead, Persian Risk, Phil Campbell and the Bastard Sons).
  - Lloyd Jones, 74, novelist
- 23 March – Peter Stead, 83, writer and broadcaster
- 26 March – Desmond Barrit, 81, actor (death announced on this date)
- 9 April – Eirwyn George, 89, poet.
- 14 May – Caroline Jones, 71, Welsh politician (MS 2016–2021), sepsis.
- 20 May – Arthur Lewis, 84, Welsh rugby union player (Ebbw Vale, British Lions, national team). (death announced on this date)
- 27 May – Owain Rhys Davies, 44, Welsh actor (Twin Peaks, Alice Through the Looking Glass, A Serial Killer's Guide to Life).
- 4 June – Aaron Cook, 46, footballer (Salisbury City, Gosport Borough, Bemerton Heath Harlequins). (death announced on this date)
- 11 June – Kenny Jackett, 64, English-born Welsh football player (Watford, Wales national team) and manager (Millwall).
- 14 June – Max Wideman, 99, Welsh-Canadian engineer.
- 20 June – Alex Hughes, 38, football player (Stockport County, Wrexham) and coach. (death announced on this date)
- 24 June – Herbie Williams, 85, footballer (Swansea City, national team). (death announced on this date)
- 3 July – Trevor Fishlock, 85, British journalist resident in Wales, known for Fishlock's Wild Tracks.
- 8 July – Bonnie Tyler, 75, singer.
- 27 July – Kevin Sinnott, 78, painter.
- 31 July – Glyn Lewis, 53, continuity announcer (BBC One Wales, BBC Two Wales). (death announced on this date)
- 4 August – Peter Gill, 86, playwright and director.
- 11 August – Steve Barwick, 65, cricketer (Glamorgan, Wales Minor Counties).
- 14 August – Finlay Tarling, 19, Welsh racing cyclist, traffic collision.
- 24 August – Sir Billy Boston, 92, Cardiff-born rugby league player for Wigan and Great Britain.
- 7 September – Sir Roger Jones, 83, pharmaceutical executive and researcher.
- 9 September – June Wyndham Davies, 97, TV producer
- 28 September – Michael Wynn-Jones, 85, writer, editor and publisher.
- 5 October – Mabel the chimpanzee, 60, elderly primate at the Welsh Mountain Zoo, Colwyn Bay.
- 6 November – Michael 'Pancho' Locke, 47, star of MTV UK's Dirty Sanchez (death announced on this date)
- 8 November – Gordon Britton, international rugby union player, 87 (death announced on this date)

== See also ==
- 2026 in Northern Ireland
- 2026 in Scotland
- 2026 in Ireland
