= List of works dubbed into Indigenous languages =

This list mentions movies and TV shows that have been dubbed into indigenous languages. These dubs are typically created to support language revitalization efforts and encourage the use of indigenous tongues. While the practice is gaining traction—especially in countries like Argentina, Australia, Canada, France, Italy, New Zealand, and the United States—such dubbed versions remain quite rare and are not yet widespread for all movies and TV shows.

== List ==
=== Films ===
Film	Language of dub	Language indigenous to –
Avril et le Monde truqué	Occitan	(Occitania) France (Occitania) Italy (Occitania) Spain (Occitania) Argentina
Bambi	Arapaho	United States
Braveheart	Breton	(Brittany) France
Chicken Run	Mi'kmaq	Canada
Coco	Quechua	Argentina; Bolivia; Ecuador; Peru
Coco	Māori	New Zealand
Cyrano de Bergerac	Occitan	(Occitania) France (Occitania) Italy (Occitania) Spain (Occitania) Argentina
El Orfanato	Breton	(Brittany) France
Encanto	Māori	New Zealand
Finding Nemo	Navajo	United States
Fistful of Dollars	Navajo	United States
Fists of Fury	Nyungar	Australia
Frozen	Māori	New Zealand
Frozen II	Sámi	Finland; Norway; Russia; Sweden
How to Train Your Dragon (2010)	Cherokee	United States
Kubo and the Two Strings	Corsican	(Corsica) France
Le Bossu	Corsican	(Corsica) France
Le Cheval d'orgueil	Breton	(Brittany) France
Le Hussard sur le toit	Occitan	(Occitania) France (Occitania) Italy (Occitania) Spain (Occitania) Argentina
Le Nom de la Rose	Occitan	(Occitania) France (Occitania) Italy (Occitania) Spain (Occitania) Argentina
Le Voyage du Prince	Occitan	(Occitania) France (Occitania) Italy (Occitania) Spain (Occitania) Argentina
Lettre à Momo	Occitan	(Occitania) France (Occitania) Italy (Occitania) Spain (Occitania) Argentina
Moana	Hawaiian	United States
Moana	Māori	New Zealand
Moana	Tahitian	French Polynesia
Night Raiders	Cree	Canada
Prey	Comanche	United States
Sinbad: Legend of the Seven Seas	Crimean Tatar	Ukraine
Spirited Away	Sámi	Finland; Norway; Russia; Sweden
Star Wars: Episode IV — A New Hope	Navajo	United States
Star Wars: Episode IV — A New Hope	Ojibwe	Canada
Star Wars: Episode IV — A New Hope	Welsh	Wales
Terminator 2: Judgment Day	Occitan	(Occitania) France (Occitania) Italy (Occitania) Spain (Occitania) Argentina
The Avengers	Lakota	United States
The Incredibles	Crimean Tatar	Ukraine
The Lion King	Crimean Tatar	Ukraine
The Lion King	Māori	New Zealand
The Lion King	Zulu	South Africa; Zimbabwe
Top End Wedding	Tetum	East Timor
Vipère au Poing	Corsican	(Corsica) France

=== Television programs ===
Television program	Language of dub	Language indigenous to
Avatar: The Last Airbender	Māori	New Zealand
The Backyardigans	Māori	New Zealand
Blake et Mortimer	Breton	(Brittany) France
Boule & Bill (2015)	Corsican	(Corsica) France
Bouli	Corsican	(Corsica) France
Bubble Guppies	Māori	New Zealand
Cédric	Occitan	(Occitania) France (Occitania) Italy (Occitania) Spain (Occitania) Argentina
Cyberchase	Māori	New Zealand
Dora the Explorer	Māori	New Zealand
Dora the Explorer	Quechua	Peru
Echo	Choctaw	United States
Garfield et Cie	Breton	(Brittany) France
Go, Diego, Go!	Hausa	Nigeria
Johnny Test	Meadow Mari	Russia
Les Tres Bessones	Occitan	(Occitania) France (Occitania) Italy (Occitania) Spain (Occitania) Argentina
Léonard	Corsican	(Corsica) France
Les Aventures de Tintin	Occitan	(Occitania) France (Occitania) Italy (Occitania) Spain (Occitania) Argentina
Les Kikekoi	Occitan	(Occitania) France (Occitania) Italy (Occitania) Spain (Occitania) Argentina
Les Nouvelles Aventures de Lucky Luke	Occitan	(Occitania) France (Occitania) Italy (Occitania) Spain (Occitania) Argentina
Les Mystèrieuses Cités d'Or	Breton	(Brittany) France
Les Shadoks	Occitan	(Occitania) France (Occitania) Italy (Occitania) Spain (Occitania) Argentina
Little J & Big Cuz	Several Indigenous Australian languages	Australia
Maggie and the Ferocious Beast	Māori	New Zealand
Masha and the Bear	Breton	(Brittany) France
The Penguins of Madagascar	Māori	New Zealand
Pépin Troispommes	Occitan	(Occitania) France (Occitania) Italy (Occitania) Spain (Occitania) Argentina
PJ Masks	Quechua	Argentina
Psycho Pass	Breton	(Brittany) France
Rolie Polie Olie	Māori	New Zealand
Spirou (1993)	Breton	(Brittany) France
SpongeBob SquarePants	Māori	New Zealand
SpongeBob SquarePants	Zulu	South Africa
Team Umizoomi	Māori	New Zealand
Titeuf	Occitan	(Occitania) France (Occitania) Italy (Occitania) Spain (Occitania) Argentina
Titeuf	Breton	(Brittany) France
We Bare Bears	Māori	New Zealand
What If...? S2:E6: What If... Kahhori Reshaped the World?	Mohawk	Canada; United States
Valérian et Laureline	Breton	(Brittany) France
Xcalibur	Occitan	(Occitania) France (Occitania) Italy (Occitania) Spain (Occitania) Argentina
Yakari	Breton	(Brittany) France
Yakari	Corsican	(Corsica) France

== See also ==
- Category:Indigenous films by language
