= David Fell =

David Fell may refer to:

- David Fell (professor) (born 1947), British biochemist and professor at Oxford Brookes University
- David Fell (politician) (1869 – 1956), Australian politician
- D. Newlin Fell (1840 – 1919), Chief Justice of the Supreme Court of Pennsylvania
