= Emyr Lewis =

Notable people named Emyr Lewis include:

- Emyr Lewis (poet), born 1957
- Emyr Lewis (rugby union), born 1968
