= Calbraith =

Calbraith is both a surname and a given name. Notable people with the name include:

- Clare Calbraith, English actress
- Arthur Calbraith Dorrance
- Calbraith Perry Rodgers, American aviator
- Matthew Calbraith Perry, American naval flag officer
- Matthew Calbraith Butler, American military commander
