= Ellyn Stern =

American voice actress

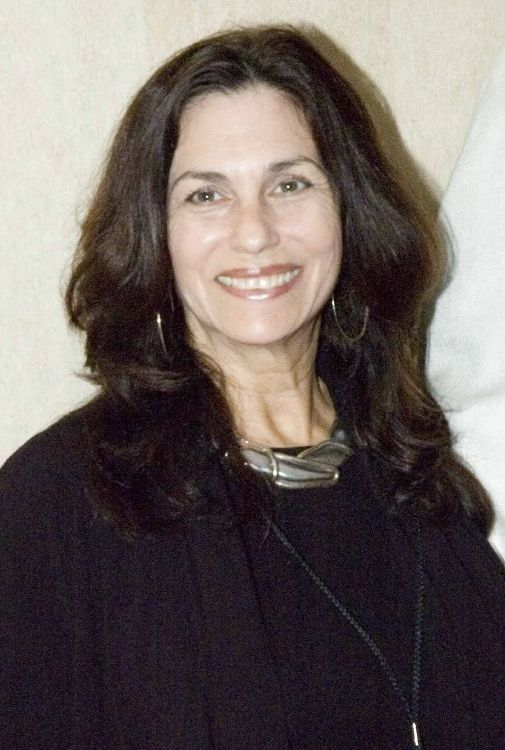
- Stern at the 2008 Florida Supercon
- Occupations: Voice actress; voice director
- Spouse: Richard Epcar (m. 1982)
- Children: 2
- Website: ellynstern.net

Ellyn Stern is an American voice actress and voice director. She has worked on various shows, including Genma Wars, Noein, and MÄR. She also voiced Masaki Kurosaki in the hit anime series Bleach.

== Filmography ==
=== Anime roles ===
- Armitage III: Poly-Matrix - Rosalind Holhess
- Bleach - Masaki Kurosaki
- Bleach: Thousand-Year Blood War - Masaki Kurosaki
- Belle - Okumoto
- Captain of the Forest - Wanda
- Fight!! Spirit of the Sword - Himeno
- Fighting Spirit - Nurse Tomiko
- Genma Wars - Parome
- Ghost in the Shell 2: Innocence - Haraway
- Legend of the Gold of Babylon - Rosetta
- Lupin III: Blood Seal of the Eternal Mermaid - Masae Tohdoh, Yao Bikuni
- Lupin III Part II - Marguerite Tiffany, Laura Jaws, Additional Voices
- Lupin III Part IV - Elena Gotti, Additional Voices
- MÄR - Jack's Mom
- Metal Fighter Miku - Sayaka; Maki Yoshihara
- Mobile Suit Gundam Unicorn - Martha Vist Carbine
- Noein - Miyuki Goto
- Patlabor WXIII - Keiko Misaki, Additional Voices
- Skip Beat! - Mrs. Taisho
- Vampire Princess Miyu - Moru (Ep. 20); Sato (Ep. 21)
- Zenki - Hiroshi's Mother

=== Video game roles ===
- Blue Dragon - Jiro's Mother, Marumaro's Mother
- Galerians - Dorothy, Elsa Steiner
- Shadow Hearts: Covenant - Veronica Vera
- Star Ocean: First Departure - Mrs. Farrence, Additional voices
- Star Ocean: Second Evolution
- Street Fighter 6 - Female Avatar 8
- Phantasy Star Online 2 - Maria

== Directorial work ==
(Lupin the 3rd, Blue Jacket Series) Director (Pokémon Generations) Director

- Reign: The Conqueror - ADR Script
- Blue Dragon - English Voice Casting
- Jade Cocoon - Director
- Star Wars: Episode IV – A New Hope - Director (Navajo dub)
- Star Wars: Gobaith Newydd - Director, Welsh dub of Star Wars: Episode IV – A New Hope
