= Mari Grug =

Welsh television presenter

Mari Grug at the 2026 National Eisteddfod

Mari Grug (born c. 1984) also known as Mari Grug James, is a Welsh television presenter from Pembrokeshire who, in 2026, became President of the National Eisteddfod of Wales.

== Early life ==
Grug grew up on a farm at Mynachlog-ddu in the Preseli Mountains of Pembrokeshire. She went to Ysgol y Preseli in Crymych, before studying Welsh at Cardiff University.

She competed at the Urdd National Eisteddfod and the National Eisteddfod of Wales, in choirs and individual competitions. At the 2002 National Eisteddfod in St Davids she was the presenter of the flower token.

== Career ==
Grug began on television as an actress. She then became a presenter on Planed Plant, before becoming a weather presenter for S4C news. She has become best known as a presenter on Radio Cymru and the S4C programmes Heno and the afternoon show Prynhawn Da.

In June 2026 she was invited to be President of the 2026 Pembrokeshire National Eisteddfod of Wales, which would be held in Pembrokeshire in August 2026. She was also inducted into the blue robes of the Gorsedd of Bards.

== Cancer diagnosis ==
Grug was diagnosed with breast cancer in May 2023 and, in July 2023, announced on social media that the cancer had spread to her liver and lymph nodes. A television programme, Mari Grug: Un dydd ar y tro ('Mari Grug: One day at a time'), was broadcast about her experiences on S4C, on 26 October 2025. She is an ambassador for Cancer Research Wales.

== Personal life ==
Grug lives in St Clears, Carmarthenshire. She is married and has three children. She a younger sister, Lisa, who in 2024 was also diagnosed with breast cancer. Their mother is Ann Siriol Davies, who was also inducted into the Gorsedd of Bards in 2026 for her services to education and Welsh culture.
