= National Commission for Wales =

Planned Welsh government body

The National Commission for Wales (Welsh: Y Comisiwn Cenedlaethol dros Gymru) is a commission set up by the Welsh Government to review the constitutional future of Wales, reviewing the case of Welsh independence, enhanced devolution or federalism.

It was announced in October 2026 by the new Plaid Cymru-led Welsh Government, with the nationalist party committing to the establishment of a national commission in their manifesto for the 2026 Senedd election as part of their plans to lay the foundations for a white paper on independence.

The commission would be an advisory independent standing body, and be led by two chairs. It would also provide advice on the proposed devolution of specific powers, and look at the responsibilities of local government in Wales. It would cost £500,000 annually.

== History and background ==
Previous commissions have been set up to review the powers of Welsh devolution, since devolution was introduced in 1999. These include the Commission on Devolution in Wales in 2011, the Commission on Justice in Wales concluding in 2019, and the Independent Commission on the Constitutional Future of Wales in 2024. The latter of which concluded that independence was a "viable" but the "most uncertain option" of the three scenarios it reviewed; more devolution, federalism and independence.

In the run-up to the 2026 Senedd election, Plaid Cymru set out in their manifesto to establish a "national commission for Wales". The party's membership had voted in October 2025 for the establishment of a "standing commission" to review the future of Wales. Although members had supported calls for such a commission to plan for a white paper on independence, but this was pushed back by leader Rhun ap Iorwerth, who stated it would not be in the "next government", instead the commission would merely set the foundations for such a white paper. The party also ruled out holding an independence referendum during the incoming Senedd term lasting until 2030, but was open to making the case for independence in a white paper should they be re-elected in 2030. A Labour source responded calling the proposal "an independence commission in all but name".

The party committed to setting a commission up in its first 100 days in government, and when questioned on taxpayer funding for the commission, ap Iorwerth said a Plaid government would be using "taxpayers money to see if there a better way of governing Wales". Following their win at the Senedd election, it later formed part of the Plaid Cymru-led government's Programme for Government.

=== Announcement ===
On 10 November 2026, the Plaid Cymru-led Welsh Government formally announced the commission. Cabinet Minister for Government Effectiveness and the Constitution, Dafydd Trystan Davies, stated "the way the United Kingdom is structured and governed is under increasing strain, and debates about devolution, accountability and where decisions should be made are increasingly pressing". The commission would be advisory and an "independent standing body", costing around £500,000 annually.

The commission is to review the constitutional future of Wales, providing "advice, evidence and analysis". Like the earlier Independent Commission on the Constitutional Future of Wales, it would review three "viable options": independence, "enhanced devolution" and a federal United Kingdom. Although the government stated it would be "distinct in nature" to the previous "time-limited" commission, building rather than repeating its work. It would also research any questions relevant to "Wales' future" and it would also provide advice on devolved powers the Welsh Government has been calling on the UK Government to devolve to Wales, including the Crown Estate in Wales, policing, justice, and rail infrastructure. It will also look at the responsibilities of local government in Wales, with the Welsh Government being pressured by Prime Minister, Andy Burnham to devolve more powers to regions of Wales.

It would be led by two chairs, Menna Rawlings, a former ambassador to France and Australia, and Emyr Lewis, a constitutional law academic and of Aberystwyth University. There is no clear set date when the commission would report its findings.

The commission's announcement was welcomed by pro-independence campaigners, with chair of the pro-independence organisation YesCymru, Rob Hughes, stated the commission was "one step forward to [...] an independent Wales", and an argument for independence needed to be built to win any referendum. Reform UK Wales' leader Helen Jenner, described the commission's set-up to be "ridiculous", stating that Wales "voted for pro-UK parties in the Senedd elections" and Wales' voters do not want to be "ripped out of the United Kingdom". Labour's Huw Thomas was cautious to the announcement, but stated "another week and another commission being established", but welcomed that the commission would look at local responsibilities. Welsh Conservative leader Darren Millar attacked the commission's establishment, predicting it would support more powers.

== Membership ==
It would be led by two chairs:

- Menna Rawlings, a former ambassador to France and Australia
- Emyr Lewis, a constitutional law academic and of Aberystwyth University

== Terms of reference ==
The commission would have four core functions:

- "Provide independent advice on devolution priorities, including areas such as the Crown Estate, rail infrastructure, justice and policing."
- "Support an ongoing national conversation about Wales’s constitutional future, engaging with people across Wales and supporting inclusive and informed public debate."
- "Strengthen the evidence base for future discussion and decision-making through research on key political, economic and democratic questions relevant to Wales’s future."
- "Help inform future reform by considering the three viable options identified by the Independent Commission: enhanced devolution, a federal United Kingdom, and independence."
