= Power: The Downfall of Huw Edwards =

2026 drama

- Screenplay by: Mark Burt
- Directed by: Michael Samuels
- Starring: Martin Clunes; Osian Morgan; Sian Reese-Williams; Jason Hughes
- Composer: Dan Jones
- Country of origin: United Kingdom
- Original language: English

Production
- Executive producers: Guy Davies; Blair Krempel; Paul Testar; Mark Wood
- Producer: Angie Daniell
- Cinematography: Sam Thomas
- Editors: Richard Cox; Isobel Stephenson
- Running time: 88 minutes
- Production companies: Wonderhood Studios; Krempelwood

Original release
- Network: 5
- Release: 24 March 2026

Power: The Downfall of Huw Edwards is a 2026 British made-for-television docudrama film produced by Wonderhood Studios, written by Mark Burt and directed by Michael Samuels. Based on the allegations against former newsreader and now convicted sex offender Huw Edwards initially reported in The Sun newspaper, the film is a retelling of Edwards' alleged relationship with a 17-year-old boy which led to his suspension from the BBC. The film was advertised as having been written based on exclusive interviews with the then 17-year-old and his family, as well as existing court reports based on Edwards' legal proceedings.

The film aired on 5 on 24 March 2026, starring Martin Clunes as Edwards and Osian Morgan as Ryan Davies, a pseudonymised version of the teenager whom Edwards' initial allegations were based on. The programme received mixed reviews from critics.

== Plot ==
In 2020, Ryan Davies, a closeted 17-year-old living with his parents in Butetown, arranges a date with catfish Alex Williams. The latter flaunts his sugar baby lifestyle and puts Ryan in contact with Huw Edwards, a BBC News presenter to whom he is also secretly supplying child pornography. Huw immediately sends Ryan £500, demanding his loyalty in return for further payment. Ryan confides in Huw about his homosexuality, but is stunned when Huw repeatedly berates him over inconsequential issues such as his overuse of filler words. He also demands that Ryan perform a striptease to earn his forgiveness. Over the coming months, Ryan continues to send Huw erotic personal videos, to which the latter masturbates.

After losing his belongings at a cocaine-fuelled party, Ryan becomes increasingly financially reliant on Huw, whose demands intensify along with his insults. Huw lures Ryan to a rural hotel, but once they are alone Ryan rejects his advances. Now addicted to drugs, Ryan reveals his relationship with Huw to his mother Carys, logging in on her phone to show her their message history. She swears secrecy but pleads with him to report Huw's behaviour. He refuses, believing that Huw's love bombing is genuine affection. Meanwhile, Huw is celebrated by his BBC colleagues – who he secretly resents – for his acclaimed announcement of Queen Elizabeth II's death. Whilst watching the announcement, Ryan also reveals his situation to his best friend Sasha, who hijacks his conversation and blackmails Huw.

Upon realising that Ryan did not log out of her phone, Carys reveals the messages to her partner Mick, who furiously travels to accost Huw. After capturing him on video at Cardiff Central where Huw has agreed to meet with Ryan, Mick attempts to complain at the BBC Cymru Wales Broadcasting House before taking the story to The Sun journalist Scarlet Howes. Huw is suspended from the BBC as a result and The Sun publish the story, albeit without naming him. After intimidating and attempting to bribe Ryan's family, Huw spirals into depression and declares his love to Ryan before admitting into hospital, as his wife makes a public confirmation that he is the subject of the Sun story. After the Metropolitan Police decide not to investigate, Carys, Mick, and Scarlet face online harassment from his supporters.

One year later, Huw is charged after being named to detectives by the now-arrested Alex, and tells police that he received and opened material shared by Alex but admits to no other wrongdoing. Scarlet informs Carys and Mick that none of Huw's charges relate to his activity with Ryan. Whilst taking solace in the presumption that he will spend time in prison, they lament that Huw will likely never face justice for his grooming of Ryan. The final scene is a fictional news bulletin featuring Huw reporting on his own six-month suspended sentence for making indecent images of children (i.e. receiving digital copies), signing off with his signature phrase "and that's all from me".

== Cast ==
- Martin Clunes as Huw Edwards, a BBC News presenter
- Osian Morgan as Ryan Davies, the pseudonymised teenager groomed by Edwards (His real name is changed to protect his identity).
- Sian Reese-Williams as Carys Davies, Ryan's mother
- Jason Hughes as Mick Granger, Ryan's step-father
- Aisha-May Hunte as Sasha, Ryan's best friend
- Chanel Cresswell as Scarlet Howes, a journalist for The Sun
- Joseph Loane as Alex Williams, a child pornography dealer
- Clare Calbraith as Victoria Newton, the editor of The Sun
- Ben Bishop as Ben O'Driscoll, a news editor at The Sun
- Lorraine Burroughs as Angelica Masters, a producer at BBC News
- Chris Jared as a BBC Wales security guard

== Production ==
The film began development twelve months before it was announced in January 2026, with 5 owner Paramount stating that the programme was built on interviews with the real-life 'Ryan' and his family, with the producers also having access to The Sun's resources relating to their investigation into Edwards. According to Burr, large sections of the script were repeated verbatim from texts between Edwards and the real-life 'Ryan'. Produced by Wonderhood Studios, it is their first drama film having been previously known exclusively for producing documentaries, and also marked the first collaboration between 5's scripted and factual commissioning teams.

The real-life 'Ryan' was given editorial control over the contents of the film, including access to its script and authority throughout. He regularly met with producers to ensure that his story remained at the forefront of the production process, according to Wonderhood co-founder Samantha Anstiss. He also gave a statement that was displayed during the credits of the film, revealing that he is now 23 years old and has overcome his drug addiction, and stating that he "refuse[s] to let Huw Edwards or what he did define who I am".

Morgan said that the film was pitched to him as Untitled Welsh Project with a fictional antagonist named Stuart who was not a newsreader, and took on the role due to wanting to appear in a Welsh project and play a more vulnerable role than the villains he had previously portrayed. Meanwhile, Clunes took time to study Edwards' mannerisms from archival footage and spoke to colleagues who recalled Edwards' "outer coldness". Make-up was used to make Clunes resemble Edwards, while the actor's prominent ears were stuck to the side of his head using putty. Secret filming took place throughout December 2025 in London and Watford.

== Release ==
Originally commissioned as a two-part television series, 5 instead premiered Power: The Downfall of Huw Edwards as a single feature-length film on 24 March 2026 at 9pm. It debuted with 1.5m overnight viewers and a share of 17.4%, up 12 points from a typical 5 programme in this slot, beating ITV1 and Channel 4 but narrowly losing out on winning its slot against 1.8m who tuned into MasterChef: The Professionals on BBC One.

== Reception ==
Power: The Downfall of Huw Edwards received polarised reviews, despite praise for Clunes' portrayal of Edwards. Writing in The Daily Telegraph, giving a four-star review, Anita Singh also acclaimed the performance of Morgan and called the extent of Edwards' behaviour stomach-turning. Also awarding four stars, Carol Midgley for The Times praised the script given the fact it was written largely from recounts of text messages. The Herald's Alison Rowat, also awarding four stars, called the film "brave, powerful, and necessary" and praised the balance of telling Ryan's story with respect to Edwards' later charges. Stuart Heritage for The Guardian, awarding three stars, concludes that despite uninteresting visuals it succeeds in its attempt to capture the viewers' emotions, calling Clunes' portrayal impressively accurate. Helen Fear for TV Guide compared the film favourably to the Netflix series Adolescence, noting that both explore themes of young male exploitation.

In a two-star review for The Independent, Adam White wrote that Clunes' standout performance was failed by a lack of sensitivity and failed apparent attempts at light humour, criticising the lack of resolution and writing. Reviewers also disagreed whether the film focussed too much on either Ryan or Edwards; in a two-star review, Vicky Jessop for The Standard welcomed the ending of Edwards' bulletin but remarking that the writing had been dampened by focussing only on Ryan and not the institutional failures that led Edwards to be able to act as he did, while WalesOnline's Ellie Gosley asked whether the film would have been better suited as a documentary, in order to focus on the real-life 'Ryan' rather than Edwards' downfall.

Sun journalist Scarlet Howes, who is fictionalised in the film, praised Power while speaking to a Society of Editors conference in London on 17 March, stating that it will provide a voice for Edwards' victims as well as allowing its viewers to empathise with journalists.

=== Huw Edwards' response ===
Prior to release, Edwards was approached by the film's producers and given the chance to offer a comment to his portrayal; he declined, and this was noted during the film's credits. However, on 23 March, Edwards released a statement to the Daily Mail criticising the programme, particularly for not disclosing whether or not anyone interviewed for its creation received payment for their contributions. He stated that the events of the film are "hardly likely to convey reality", revealing that he is working to produce his own account of events but that the process had been slowed on accord of his poor mental health. Edwards' publicist Barry Tomes said this would be in the form of a documentary, and that Edwards was looking to use the attention surrounding Power as a "springboard", though denied that he ever plans to return to mainstream television.

Edwards' response was widely criticised, with commentators noting that the statement appeared to have a victimhood mindset. Marina Hyde, writing in The Guardian, ridiculed his demands to know about the producers' payments to interviewees as someone alleged by the film to have himself made covert payments, saying that if he did not want derogatory films made about him then "he should have thought of that" before committing the acts dramatised therein. Similarly, in The Spectator, Julie Burchill criticised the "shocking entitlement" of appearing to use his mental health as an excuse for his actions. 5 commissioner Guy Davies also commented that that the producers had never intended to collaborate with Edwards in producing the project and insisted that the Broadcasting Code has been followed throughout the production process. Speaking to Good Morning Britain, Clunes remarked on the circularity of Edwards' upset, noting that he would have equally reported on the negative press of others as a BBC newsreader. An appearance of Tomes on Good Morning Britain in the wake of the film's release was also panned as a "car crash".
