= 2026 Pembrokeshire National Eisteddfod =

2026 festival in Pembrokeshire, Wales

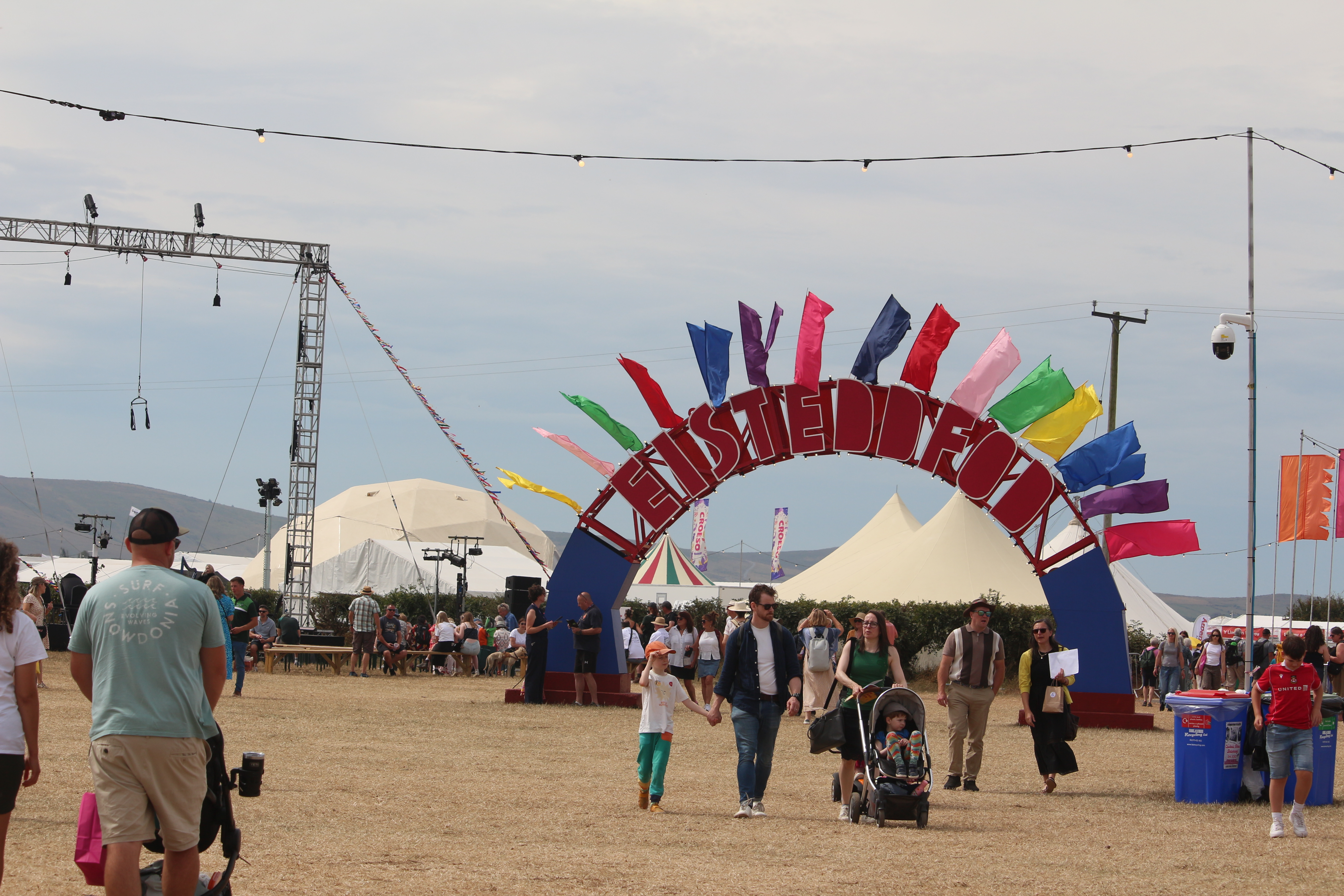
- Maes at the 2026 National Eisteddfod
- Native name: Eisteddfod Genedlaethol y Garreg Las 2026
- Date: 1–8 August 2026
- Duration: 8 days
- Location: Llantood; 52.0502°N 4.6975°W
- Theme: Welsh language and culture

The 2026 Pembrokeshire National Eisteddfod of Wales was held near the village of Llantood, Pembrokeshire, Wales from 1 to 8 August 2026. Known in Welsh as the Eisteddfod y Garreg Las ('Eisteddfod of the Blue Stone') after the distinctive local blue rock spanning the borders of Pembrokeshire, Ceredigion and Carmarthenshire. Llantood is not far from the town of Cardigan, where the first recorded eisteddfod took place 850 years beforehand.

The event was expected to attract over 150,000 visitors.

== Background ==
The modern National Eisteddfod of Wales has been held every year (with the exception of 1914, 2020 and 2021) since 1861. It is hosted by a different region of Wales each year. Around 1,000 events and 200 competitions are held, in poetry, music, dance, drama and literature, giving it a claim to be probably the largest music and poetry festival in Europe. The main competition events are the Crowning of the Bard and the Chairing of the Bard

The National Eisteddfod had been held in Pembrokeshire on several occasions, but most recently at St Davids in 2002.

In early July 2024 Pembrokeshire County Council took a vote to invite the National Eisteddfod back to Pembrokeshire, particularly the area around Cardigan (in neighbouring Ceredigion) to mark the 850th anniversary of the first recorded eisteddfod held by Lord Rhys in Cardigan in 1176. In September 2024 it was confirmed That Pembrokeshire would host the 2026 National Eisteddfod, with a catchment area also covering communities in west Carmarthenshire and south Ceredigion. Llantood, in the far north of Pembrokeshire, was confirmed as the site for the festival.

== Preparations ==
The proclamation ceremony for the 2026 National Eisteddfod took place on the 17 May 2025 in the town of Narberth, announcing the intention to hold the next National Eisteddfod in Pembrokeshire. The ceremony included a colourful procession of local organisations and members of the Gorsedd through the main streets of the town, followed by a ceremony at the local Gorsedd stones. The list of intended eisteddfod competitions for 2026 was presented to the Archdruid, Mererid Hopwood.

S4C and Radio Cymru presenter, Mari Grug, was announced as the President of the National Eisteddfod. She had grown up and went to school at Ysgol y Preseli in north Pembrokeshire. She would act as an ambassador for the event and address the eisteddfod at the opening ceremony.

Expressions of interest in creating the main Eisteddfod prizes, the Chair and the Crown, were invited in April 2025. Both of the completed objects were revealed at a ceremony in St Davids on 18 June 2026. The Chair, designed by teacher and craftsman, Tomos Lewis, used locally sourced oak, Preseli bluestone and Melin Tregwynt fabric. It had references to the 1176 chair of Lord Rhys, the Preseli mountains, the Rebecca Riots and the three counties of the 2026 Eisteddfod. The Crown was designed by Elen and Dylan Bowen of Newcastle Emlyn using bluestone and fabric from Llandovery.

Local fundraising committees raised £528,000 prior to the festival, claimed to be "the largest amount ever collected by a local fund for a National Eisteddfod". Pembrokeshire County Council had approved an initial council funding of £73,751 in June, with up to £200,000 available to promote the event.

== The Tour of Lord Rhys ==
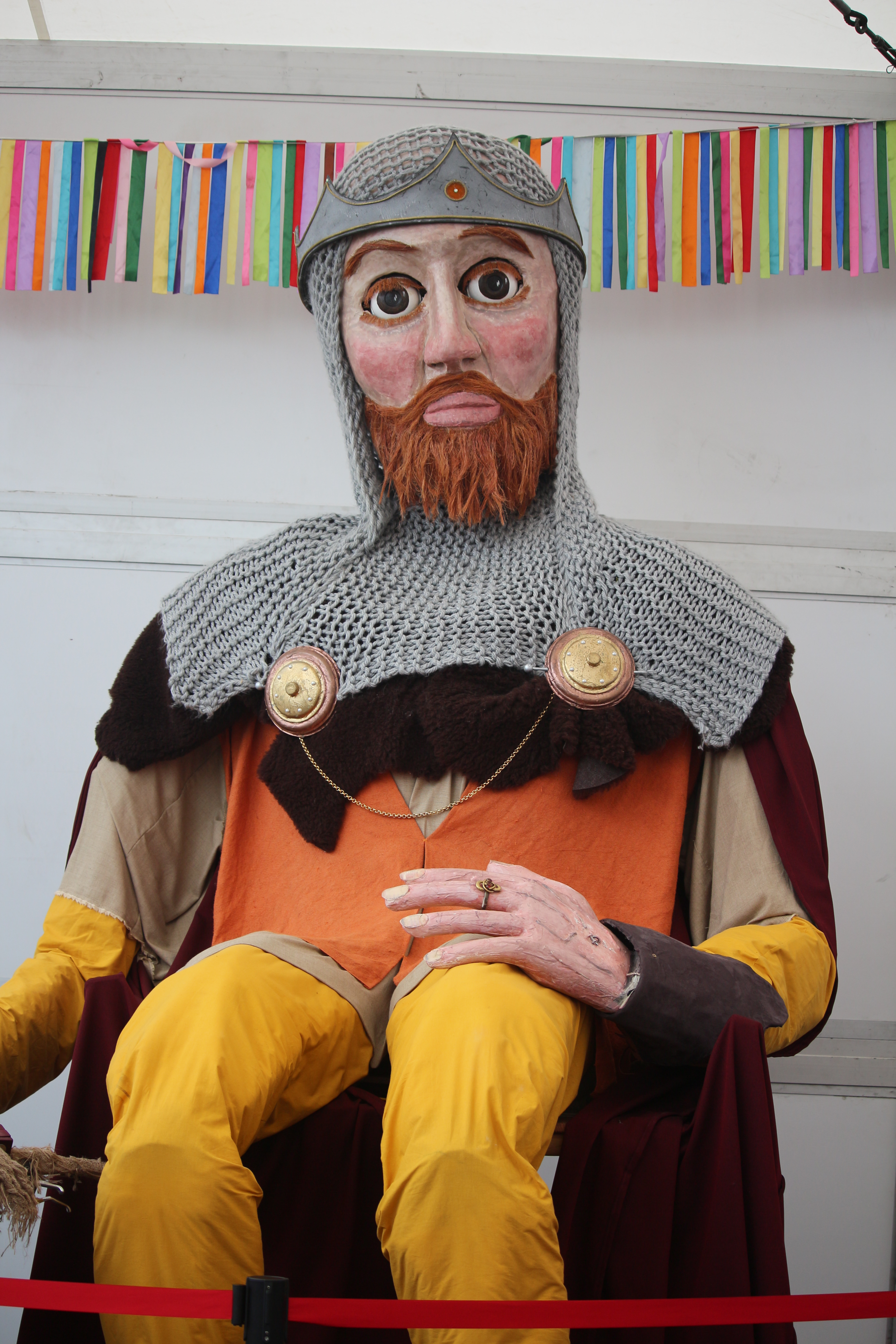
Lord Rhys puppet at the National Eisteddfod

To mark the 850th anniversary of the first recorded eisteddfod, held by Lord Rhys at Cardigan Castle in 1176, a giant puppet of Lord Rhys (and his dog Teifi) paraded through Pembrokeshire in June 2026. The tour was named Carreg Filltir Las: Taith Yr Arglwydd Rhys ('Blue Milestone: The Tour of Lord Rhys'), referencing the Carreg Las ('Blue Stone') in the name of the 2026 National Eisteddfod. Beginning in St Davids on 19 June, the performance travelled to Pembrokeshire locations including Cenarth, Newcastle Emlyn, Talgarreg, Llangrannog and Maenclochog. The journey came to end in Cardigan on Saturday 27 June, with a concert in Cardigan Castle, followed by a parade including Lord Rhys through the town's streets. The Eisteddfod Chair was carried over Cardigan Bridge on a hay cart led by a shire horse while the Crown arrived by a flotilla of boats up the River Teifi.

== 2026 location and facilities ==
The 2026 Maes (festival ground) was located in fields off the Glanrhyd Road at the small Pembrokeshire village of Llantood. With the nearest railway station being at Carmarthen, a free shuttle bus service was provided between the railway station and the eisteddfod site. The TrawsCymru T5 bus service between Fishguard and Cardigan stopped directly at Llantood. A bus service was also available from Narberth. As well as car parking, a caravan site and camping site at Llantood was created for the event.

Located on the Maes were the main Pavilion, Babell Lên (literary pavilion), Y Lle Celf (visual arts pavilion), Tŷ Gwerin (folk tent), Maes D (learners' area), Sinemaes (cinema), Pentref Plant (children's 'village'), Pentref Gwyddoniaeth a Thechnoleg (science and technology 'village'), Mas ar y Maes (LCBTQ+ hub) and Pentre’r Garreg Las (showcase for the 'Bluestone' area). There was a large open-air stage for music events. Over 200 stalls selling products and promoting organisations were on site.

== Notable events ==
Welsh band, the Super Furry Animals, performed at the National Eisteddfod for the first time in 30 years, bringing events to a close on the main stage on the first Saturday of the festival. The band played the whole of their 2000 album, Mwng, during their set, making it their first entirely Welsh-language set.

A new musical, Sefyll ar y Sgwar ('Standing on the Square'), was performed in the Pavilion at the National Eisteddfod on a number of occasions during the week. The musical celebrated the songs of pioneering Welsh group, Ail Symudiad. It was written by Nico Dafydd and Mari Elen and directed by Siwan Llynor. The musical involved actors, a band and the Eisteddfod choir of over 300 members and was performed in a 1960s style setting.

Some controversy erupted following the Crowning of the Bard when it was discovered that the former BBC journalist, Huw Edwards, had entered the competition. Edwards had been convicted of child sex offences in 2024 and placed on the sex offenders' register. In line with the rules of the competition, Edwards had entered his poem under a pseudonym - Gelyn, meaning 'Enemy'. He said he wrote his poem as a tribute to his father, Hywel Teifi Edwards. The poem did not come close to winning, though actress Sera Cracoft said it would have been "catastrophic" if he had won.

== Main awards ==
=== Chairing of the Bard ===
The 2026 Eisteddfod Chair was awarded on 7 August to Emyr Lewis, a professor of law and criminology at Aberystwyth University. He had previously won the Chair in 1994. His winning awdl, on the subject of Llinell/Llinellau ('Line/Lines'), spanned 8 centuries and was described by the judges as "a riot of an awdl". Lewis submitted under the pen-name A. There were 16 entries in total, the highest number since 1988. One of the judges, Idris Reynolds, described the competition as the tightest since 1976.

=== Crowning of the Bard ===
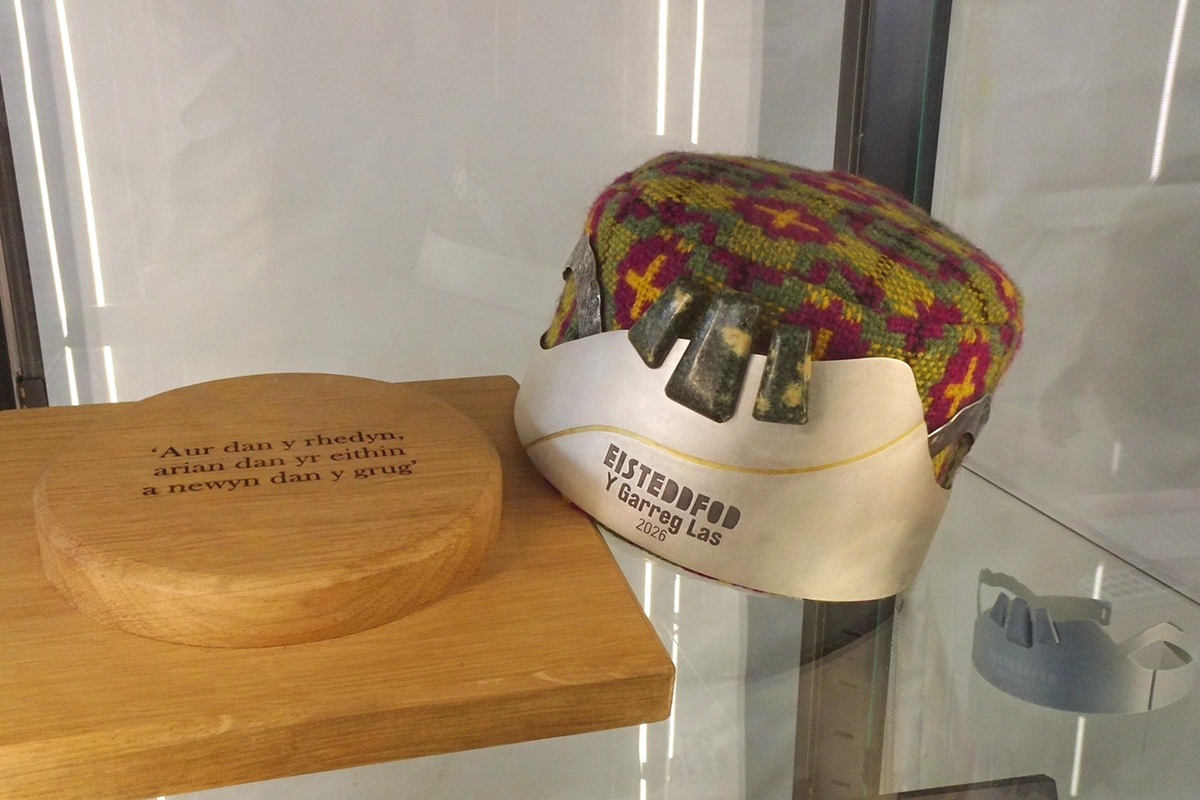
2026 Crown, designed by Elen and Dylan Bowen

The 2026 Eisteddfod Crown was awarded on 3 August to Martin Huws, a veteran journalist from Taffs Well. The task was to create a poem or poems of up to 250 lines on the subject of Adnabod ('Knowing'). Huws wrote his collection under the pen-name Fan[-]go. The judges described his entry as "A striking collection in terms of theme, and in terms of the craft and bold creativity".

=== Gold Medals ===
Gold medals were awarded on the first Saturday to winners at the Eisteddfod's art and design exhibition, Y Lle Celf, with exhibitors selected from more than 300 entries. The 2026 winners were:

- Gold Medal for Craft and Design - Ceramicist Justine Allison, from Newcastle Emlyn, won the Gold Medal and £5000 for her porcelain vessels.
- Gold Medal for Fine Art - Sarah Williams, an artist from near St Davids, Pembrokeshire, received the Gold Medal and £5000 for her paintings and cut-outs which explored Welsh mythology.

=== Science and Technology Medal ===
The Science and Technology Medal was awarded to Professor Siwan Davies of Swansea University, who had been instrumental in developing Welsh-medium education and research at the university.

=== R. Alun Medal ===
The R. Alun Medal was awarded to Penri Williams for over 40 years of service to the Welsh language and culture. He had been editor of the Valleys community newspaper, Tafod Elai, for 38 years.

=== TH Parry-Williams Memorial Medal ===
The TH Parry-Williams Memorial Medal, in its 50th year, was awarded to Islwyn Evans from Carmarthenshire. He had been leading choirs in Wales for 40 years.

== Honours ==
=== Honorary presidents ===
Five honorary presidents were announced, including the late Prifardd, Eirwyn George, who had died in April. The others were choir leader Margaret Daniels, author Alun Ifans, dancer Eddie Ladd and rugby player Ifan Phillips.

=== Gorsedd Cymru ===
In May Gorsedd Cymru announced who would be inducted into their ranks as Honorary Druids at the 2026 Eisteddfodd, on either Monday 3 August or Friday 7 August. They would receive either Blue robes - for services to the nation in a number of areas - or Green robes - for services to the Arts.

==== Blue robes ====
- John Adams-Lewis (councillor and teacher)
- Joe Allen (Wales footballer)
- Heledd Cynwal (TV presenter)
- Nia Wyn Davies (Welsh language volunteer)
- Aled Eurig (fmr Head of News, BBC Wales )
- Wyn Evans (fmr co-editor, Y Cardi Bach)
- Meirwen Evans (fmr co-editor, Y Cardi Bach)
- Neville Evans (National Eisteddfod staff)
- Jaci Gruffudd (Welsh language learner/promoter)
- Eluned Hâf (cultural ambassador)
- Angharad James (Wales footballer)
- Mari Grug James (TV presenter)
- Wynfford James (Welsh language/business promoter)
- Jennifer Jenkins (charity volunteer)
- Arwel Jones (National Eisteddfod treasurer)
- Geraint Herbert Jones (Gorsedd organiser)
- Heulwen Jones (Eisteddfod Council member)
- Natalie Jones (S4C)
- Tegryn Jones (Pembrokeshire Coast National Park Authority)
- Eurfyl Lewis (Urdd Officer, Pembrokeshire)
- Jean Lewis (community leader)
- Gwenda Mathias (charity fundraiser)
- Rhodri Siôn Morgan (S4C)
- Steve Perks (athlete and coach)
- Denise Lewis Poulton (cultural board member)
- Huw Llywelyn Roberts (Welsh language/business promoter)
- Glenys Ann Thomas (Welsh teacher)
- Hywel Thomas (academic)
- Owen Thomas (barrister)
- Wyn Thomas (teacher, county councillor)
- Dylan Williams (Darts Cymru)
- Hubert Alun Williams (veteran campaigner)

==== Green robes ====
- Eifion Daniels
- Ann Siriol Davies
- Catrin Davies
- Emyr Davies
- Malachy Owain Edwards
- Carys Hedd
- Jo Heyde
- Jane James
- Wendy Lewis
- Elin Meek
- Bethan Miles
- Keri Graham Morgan
- Meinir Jones Parry
- Rhiannon Pritchard
- Aleighcia Scott
- Ryland Teifi
- Eleri Twynog
- Gillian Elisa Thomas
- Jane Watts
- Efan Miles Williams
- Eiri Thrasher

== See also ==
- 2025 Wrexham National Eisteddfod
- 2024 Rhondda Cynon Taf National Eisteddfod
