= Herbert M. Sauro =

British scientist (born 1960)

- Born: July 1960 (age 66); Dyfed, Wales
- Education: University of Kent Canterbury (BSc); University of York (MSc); Oxford Brookes University (PhD); Aberystwyth University (PCGE)
- Known for: metabolic control analysis, metabolic regulation, SBML
- Scientific career
- Fields: Biochemistry, Bioengineering, systems biology
- Workplaces: University of Edinburgh; Keck Graduate Institute; University of Washington
- Thesis: Control analysis and simulation of metabolism (1986)
- Academic advisors: David Fell

Herbert M. Sauro (born 19 July 1960) is a Welsh biochemist who works in the field of metabolic control analysis and systems biology.

== Early and education ==
Sauro grew up in the village of Llangolman in Pembrokeshire and attended the Welsh comprehensive school Ysgol y Preseli.

After obtaining a B.Sc. in biochemistry with microbiology at the University of Kent Canterbury and an M.Sc. in biological computing at the University of York, Sauro moved to Oxford Brookes University for his Ph.D. (1986) under the direction of David Fell, for a thesis entitled Control analysis and simulation of metabolism, work that led to several publications, including one in which new relationships between elasticities and control coefficients were described. Subsequently he obtained a teaching degree at the University of Aberystwyth.

== Research ==
Sauro carried out post-doctoral research at the University of Edinburgh in association with Henrik Kacser, when he worked on time-dependent systems and enzyme-enzyme interactions.

While a student at Oxford Brookes Sauro wrote a program called SCAMP for modelling metabolic systems, later developed as Jarnac and incorporated in his Systems Biology Workbench.

Together with Hamid Bolouri, Andrew Finney and Michael Hucka he was a member of the development team for the creation of SBML (the Systems Biology Mark-up language), which has become a major influence on the subject.

In 2018, Sauro's research group published Tellurium, a Python-based modeling environment with applications in system analysis and synthetic biology.

== Books ==
Sauro is the author of books on metabolic control analysis, enzyme kinetics, and Laplace transforms.

== Career ==
After some years, first at Caltech (2000-2005), then at the Keck Graduate Institute in Claremont, California (2004-2007), Sauro moved to the University of Washington as an Associate professor in the department of Bioengineering in 2007. In 2013 he earned the University of Washington College of Engineering, Community of Innovators Awards, Faculty Innovator: Teaching & Learning.

He is currently the director of the NIH Center for Reproducible Biomedical Modeling.
