= Star Wars: Gobaith Newydd =

- Directed by: Ellyn Stern
- Produced by: Michael Kohn
- Production companies: Lucasfilm; Disney; S4C
- Release date: 25 December 2026
- Countries: United States; Wales
- Language: Welsh

Star Wars: Gobaith Newydd ('New Hope') is a Welsh language version of the original 1977 Star Wars film. The latter was dubbed into Welsh for the first time, in anticipation of the Star Wars 50th anniversary.

== Background ==
The original Star Wars film was directed by George Lucas and released in May 1977. It starred actors who were fairly unknown, such as Mark Hamill and Carrie Fisher, who became big stars as a result. Following the release of three prequels in 1999, 2002 and 2005 the original film was renamed Star Wars: Episode IV – A New Hope.

Since 1977, words and phrases from Star Wars have become common part of the English language and, since the 1970s, Star Wars films have been translated into more than 50 languages, including for example Native American languages such as Navajo and Ojibwe.

The Welsh Government had been working towards a target of creating 1 million Welsh speakers by 2030. The Welsh Star Wars project was intended to attract new speakers of the language.

The project to dub Star Wars into Welsh was announced at the 2026 National Eisteddfod of Wales, on 4 August 2026.

== Voice cast ==
- Osian Morgan as Luke Skywalker
- Matthew Rhys as Han Solo
- Aimee-Ffion Edwards as Princess Leia
- Mark Lewis Jones as Darth Vader
- Rhys Ifans as Obi-Wan Kenobi
- Llŷr Ifans as C-3PO
- Richard Harrington as Grand Moff Tarkin
- Owain Arthur as Red Leader
- Rhodri Meilir as Gold Leader
- Nia Roberts as Aunt Beru

== Production ==
Producer Michael Kohn, the director of distribution operations at Lucasfilm, had been involved in previous dubs of Star Wars into minority languages. Production companies Lucasfilm and Disney worked in collaboration with the Welsh-language television channel, S4C, and Creative Wales. The Welsh Government invested £100,000 into the project.

The film was adapted into Welsh by writer Angharad Elen, with support from novelist and academic Angharad Price.

Matthew Rhys, speaking to a New York Times podcast, described the experience as "weird" that "they'd had to translate all these things that we'd grown up with, knowing Star Wars. I was saying in Welsh things like 'pelydr cyrchu'... it's kind of like 'tractor beam'. There were words I've never used before, and I was tripping on them."

The opening line of the film "A long time ago in a galaxy far, far away... " became "Amser maith yn ôl, mewn galaeth bell bell i ffwrdd... " and "May the force be with you" became "A boed i’r Grym fod gyda chi."

== Release ==
Star Wars: Gobaith Newydd will be broadcast for the first time on S4C, on Christmas Day, 25 December 2026. A red carpet screening of the film took place at Cineworld, Cardiff, on 19 November 2026. Mark Lewis Jones, Llŷr Ifans and Osian Morgan were amongst those attending.

== Reception ==
Reacting to the announcement of the project, the retiring Director of Communications for S4C, Gwyn Williams, called it a "safe, cheap and unimaginative way to fill television hours." He described it as "telling someone else's story" and argued that S4C's job should be to tell the stories of Wales.
