= Eirwyn George =

Welsh poet (1936–2026)

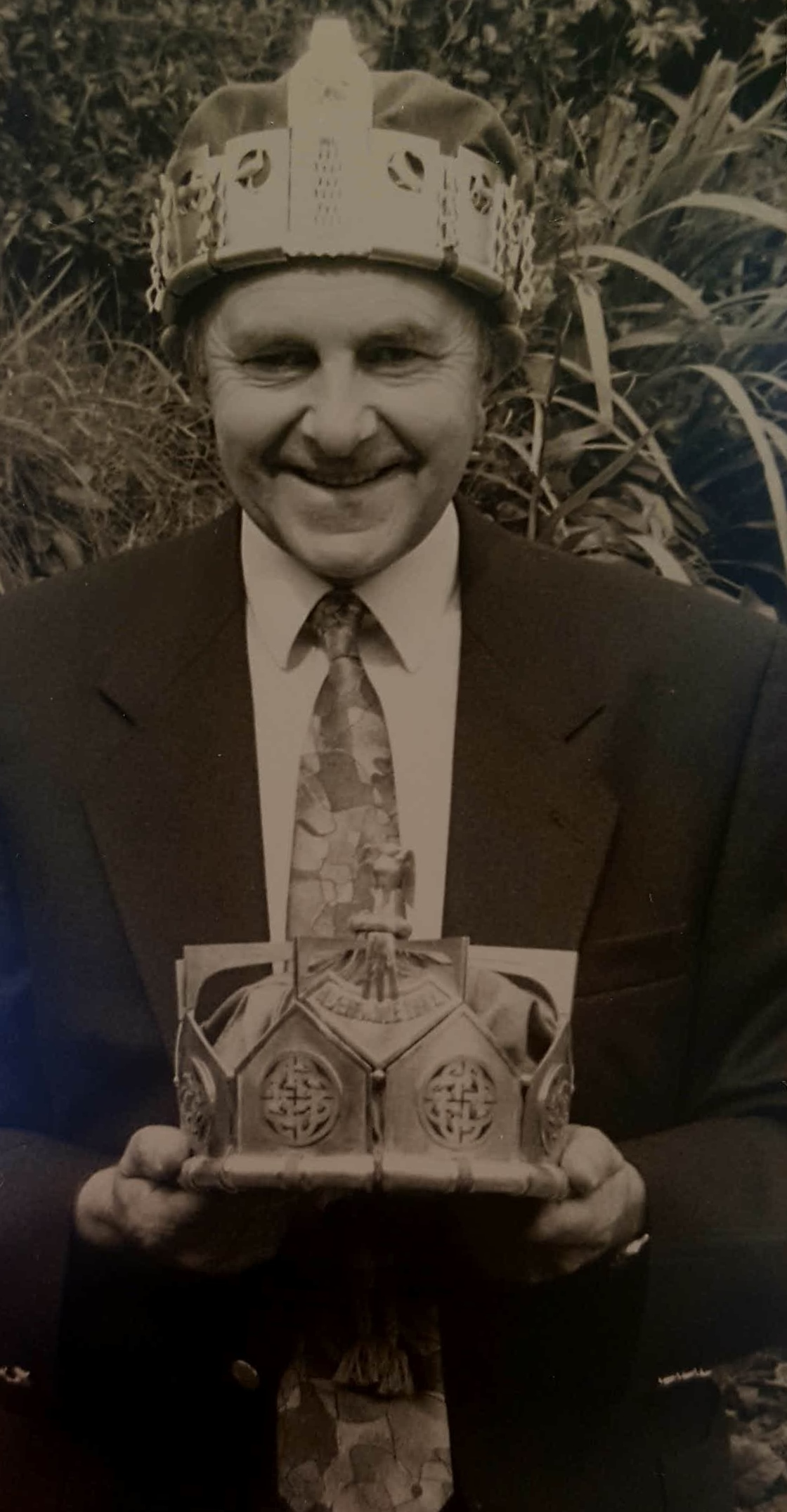
George receiving the Eisteddfod crown

Eirwyn George (1936 – 9 April 2026) was a Welsh poet and teacher. He won the crown of the National Eisteddfod of Wales in 1982 and 1993, earning him the title of Prifardd.

== Life ==
Born in Tufton, Pembrokeshire, an only child, his father was a farmer who had a taste for composing verses to celebrate special occasions in the area. When Eirwyn was nine years old, the family moved to Castellhenri farm between the villages of Maenclochog and Chas-mael.

George attended Ysgol Garnochor and later obtained a specialized honors degree in Welsh in 1967 from Coleg Ger y Lli. He became a teacher of Welsh and History at Narberth Secondary School and Ysgol y Preseli, Crymych, and later, Activities Librarian at the County Library in Haverfordwest. He was also He was chaplain and Honorary President of the Waldo Society, which published an anthology of lectures in 2024, with Eirwyn George as one of its editors.

In June 2026 he was posthumously announced as an honorary president of the Eisteddfod y Garreg Las.

== Personal life ==
Eirwyn George and his wife (since 1981), Maureen, lived at Maenclochog.

== Death ==
Eirwyn George died on 9 April 2026, at the age of 89.
