= Osian Morgan =

Welsh actor

Osian Morgan is a Welsh actor. His roles include Aaron Monk on Pobol y Cwm (2016–2024), Myles Massey on Waterloo Road (2023), Josh Cope on Emmerdale (2024), and Ryan Davies on Power: The Downfall of Huw Edwards (2026).

== Career ==
Morgan acted in Welsh-language soap opera Pobol y Cwm as Aaron Monk, a character whose mother had bipolar disorder. In 2023, he was cast on Waterloo Road as Myles Massey, a 16-year-old released from a football academy; Morgan said he empathised with the character, having been released by Cardiff City at age 14. Morgan said of the character "I can imagine most people are absolutely going to despise him. Just for the record, this isn't me. This is a character I'm playing". In June 2024, he debuted on Emmerdale as troublemaker Josh Cope. The character harassed trans man character Matty Barton, whose actor Ash Palmisciano said "I think the audience will really dislike [Josh Cope] but that's because [Osian Morgan] nailed it and did such a good job".

In 2026, Morgan appeared in Power: The Downfall of Huw Edwards as "Ryan Davies" (pseudonym), a 17-year-old who was groomed by newsreader and sex offender Huw Edwards. Morgan said that the series was pitched to him as Untitled Welsh Project with a fictional antagonist named Stuart who was not a newsreader. Having previously played dominant villains, Morgan enjoyed playing a vulnerable character.

Morgan will voice the character Luke Skywalker in Star Wars: Gobaith Newydd, the Welsh-language version of Star Wars: Episode IV - A New Hope, which is to be dubbed into Welsh for the first time as the film prepares to celebrate its 50th anniversary in 2027.
