= Ysgol Bro Preseli =

Location
- Crymych, Pembrokeshire, SA41 3QH; Wales; 51.971°N 4.647°W

Information
- Former name: Ysgol y Preseli
- Type: State school
- Motto: 'Gwreiddiau a Gorwelion'
- Established: 2022 (as Ysgol Bro Preseli); 1958 (for Ysgol y Preseli)
- Local authority: Pembrokeshire
- Chairman: Des Davies
- Head: Rhonwen Morris
- Gender: Both
- Age: 11 to 18
- Enrolment: 906 (in 2016)
- Houses: Nyfer , Tâf , Cleddau
- Colours: Years 7 - 11, White and dark gray , Years 12 - 13, White and Black
- Website: https://ysgolbropreseli.cymru

Ysgol Bro Preseli is a Welsh 3-18 school in the village of Crymych, Pembrokeshire, Wales. It was formed in 2022 following the merger of Ysgol y Preseli with the neighbouring primary school Ysgol Y Frenni.

== History ==
Prior to the Ysgol y Preseli's opening, pupils from the villages in the north of the county that passed the eleven-plus exam attended schools in either Narberth or Cardigan. Pembrokeshire County Council took the decision to build a new school for these pupils, and the school was opened in autumn 1958. Ysgol Y Preseli was declared an official bilingual school on 1 September 1991. Before this time it was called "Ysgol Gyfun Ddwyieithog y Preseli" (Preseli bilingual comprehensive school). The school's slogan is "Gwreiddiau a Gorwelion", which translates from Welsh to "Roots and Horizons"

On 30 January 2009 D. Martin Lloyd stepped down as headmaster of the school, after 19 years in the role, in order to take up a position as manager of the National Professional Qualification for Headship. Michael Davies, the deputy headmaster, was appointed the acting headmaster and in February 2009 was promoted to headmaster. In October 2020, Michael Davies stepped down, and Rhonwen Morris was appointed the new headmaster, making her the first female headmaster of Ysgol Bro Preseli

=== Merger ===
In 2022 Ysgol y Preseli merged with its neighbouring primary school, Ysgol Y Frenni to form Ysgol Bro Preseli. making it a 3-18 welsh medium school. The reason behind this merger is due to a large amount of debt accumulated by both schools. This merger was a way of relieving this debt.

== Welsh language ==
Approximately 43% of pupils come from Welsh-speaking homes, and nearly all pupils speak Welsh fluently. Ysgol y Preseli is currently a Category 2A Bilingual school, meaning that at least 80% of subjects, apart from English and Welsh (however Science is an option) are taught only through the medium of Welsh to all pupils. Welsh is the administrative language of the school. All extra curricular activities are also conducted through the medium of Welsh. In addition, pupils are expected to speak Welsh to each other outside of the classroom.

== Academic standards ==
In the latest Estyn school inspection in 2016, Ysgol y Preseli was recognised as a "good school with outstanding features": point 1 on a five-point scale. In the latest move by the Welsh Government, introducing banding to schools, Ysgol Y Preseli was the only school in Pembrokeshire to rate in the best first band.

Estyn's latest inspection report (2016) shows that the school had a GCSE pass rate of 60% (5 GCSEs grades A*-C), and 98% should gain at least five GCSEs grades A*-G.

Ysgol Bro Presli's first A-level and GCSE grades in 2022 meant it became the best performing secondary school in Wales.

== Eisteddfod ==
Ysgol Y Preseli holds an annual Eisteddfod. The event is split into two parts: junior (Iau) and senior (Hyn). These are a school-based rendition of the Welsh 'Cadair y Beirdd' (bardic chair).

== Curriculum ==
Pupils must study all Core, Humanities, Creative, and Technology subjects plus French in years 7,8 and 9. Pupils in years 10 and 11 must study the Core Subjects as well as a choice of 4 other GCSE subjects. Years 12 and 13 have a choice to study either 3 or 4 AS/A Levels from any of the curriculum subjects. The Welsh Baccalaureate Qualification is also a part of the curriculum at Ysgol y Preseli, pupils in Year 11 will complete the Welsh Baccalaureate at Intermediate level and Advanced level in years 12 and 13.

== Notable former pupils ==
- Joe Allen, international football player
- Mari Grug, television presenter
- Angharad James-Turner, international football player and captain of the Wales women's national football team
- Herbert M. Sauro, systems biologist, Professor of Bioengineering
- Stephen Varney, Italian international rugby union player
- Brian Williams, international rugby player
- Peredur ap Gwynedd, musician
