= Gordon Britton =

Welsh rugby union player (1939–2026)

- Full name: Gordon Richard Britton
- Born: 10 September 1939 Risca, Wales
- Died: November 2026 (aged 87)
- School: Pontymister Secondary School
- Occupation: Policeman

Rugby union career
- Position: Centre
Senior career
Years	Team	Apps	(Points)
1959–69	Newport	212	(123)
International career
Years	Team	Apps	(Points)
1961	Wales	1	(0)

Gordon Richard Britton (10 September 1939 – November 2026) was a Welsh international rugby union player.

== Biography ==
Born in Risca, Monmouthshire, Britton was educated at Pontymister Secondary School and spent most of his career with Newport, which he joined in 1959 from hometown club Risca RFC.

Britton gained a Wales cap as a centre against Scotland at Murrayfield in the 1961 Five Nations.

In 1966, Britton played for Newport against the touring Wallabies and late in the match suffered a head knock after being tackled by three Australian players. He had to be given mouth-to-mouth on the pitch by the Newport club doctor due to breathing difficulties and went to hospital with concussion.

Britton's death at age 87 was announced on 8 November 2026 by Newport RFC.

== See also ==
- List of Wales national rugby union players
