= David Fell (biochemist) =

British biochemist (b. 1947)

- Born: 16 December 1947 (age 78)
- Education: University of Oxford
- Known for: metabolic control analysis, elementary modes, flux balance analysis
- Scientific career
- Fields: systems biology, network biology, genetics
- Workplaces: Oxford Brookes University
- Thesis: (1974)
- Doctoral advisor: Arthur Peacocke
- Doctoral students: Herbert M. Sauro

David A. Fell is a British biochemist and professor of systems biology at Oxford Brookes University. He has published over 200 publications, including a textbook on Understanding the control of metabolism in 1996.

== Early work ==
Fell did research on the physical biochemistry of yeast pyruvate kinase. He obtained a position at Oxford Polytechnic as a lecturer. His early work at Oxford Polytechnic focussed on haemoglobin where he developed more precise techniques for monitoring oxygen saturation and the breakdown of 2,3-bisphosphoglycerate by Fe(III)-haemoglobin. At this time he also worked on the first modelling studies related to the functioning of high- and low-K_{m} cyclic nucleotide phosphodiesterases on the regulation of adenosine 3',5'-cyclic monophosphate (cAMP)

== Later career ==
From the early 1980s David Fell switched his research to systems biology and was one of the earliest systems biologists in the UK, with publications from 1979 onwards. The other notable systems biologist at time was Henrik Kacser at the University of Edinburgh. Given that his early work had a significant mathematical and computational component, he was ideally positioned to consider a more quantitative approach to studying the properties of cellular networks. It was against this background that he turned to the relatively new field called metabolic control analysis as a means to understand the principles of metabolic regulation. Before the development of metabolic control analysis, understanding metabolism was based on qualitative arguments which resulted in some incorrect conclusions (rate-limiting steps). Much of Fell's research for the next 20 years focussed on extending and applying metabolic control analysis to metabolism. This work culminated in the publication of his textbook, Understanding the control of metabolism. In 1986 he published with his graduate student Rankin Small, one of the earliest flux-balance models where they used linear programming to examine the efficiency in the conversion of glucose into fat. He was also one of the first researchers to use the Gillespie method for stochastic simulation in cellular biology, a method that is now routinely used in systems biology. In the late 1990s his research started shifting more towards stoichiometric analysis with particular emphasis on elementary modes and the analysis of larger networks such as those involved in photosynthesis and whole genome scale models in a variety of organisms including one of the first genome scale models of Arabidopsis.

== Publications ==
Other than his textbook, which has been cited 1464 times (Sept, 2018), his top ten publications include: two publications related to the evolutionary age of metabolism using small-world analysis, the definition of a pathway in terms of elementary modes, three reviews on metabolic control analysis including a republication of the seminal work, Control of Flux by Kacser and Burns, two research papers on metabolic control analysis, one of the earliest papers on the use of flux-balance analysis, one of the earliest papers that describes a model the MAPK pathway in EGF signalling, and well as the earliest paper that describes the whole genome-scale model of the plant Arabidopsis.
