= Clare Calbraith =

English actress (born 1974)

Clare Michelle Calbraith (born 1 January 1974) is an English actress, born in Winsford, Cheshire, and raised in Liverpool and Cheshire. Her appearances include roles in Vera, the ITV period drama series Home Fires, and Downton Abbey, together with the BBC2 drama The Shadow Line.

== Biography ==
Calbraith has appeared in many other television series, including Vera, DCI Banks, Silent Witness, Casualty, Holby City, The Bill, 55 Degrees North, and as Dr Tricia Summerbee in Heartbeat. She joined Coronation Street in 2005 for a short time to play Robyn, girlfriend of Martin Platt. In 2007, she guest-starred in the Doctor Who audio dramas Urban Myths and Son of the Dragon. In 2008, she guest-starred in the Sapphire and Steel audio drama Second Sight and Doctors. In 2011, she played Laura Gabriel in the BBC TV series, The Shadow Line. From 2012 to 2014, she played Shep in the ITV series Vera.

== Filmography ==
=== Film ===
Year	Title	Role	Notes
2005	Crossing the Line	Becky	Short film
2012	Neighbors	Jean	
2013	Mindscape	Jaime Feld	
2021	The Man at the Bottom of the Garden	Jessica	Short film
2023	Wake Up	Layla	Short film
TBA	The Face of Horror	Mathilda	Post-production

=== Television ===
Year	Title	Role	Notes
1999	Casualty	Tanya Hardie	Episode: "Human Traffic"
2000	Black Cab	Sara	Episode: "Silent Night"
2000–2002	Heartbeat	Dr. Tricia Summerbee	Series 10–12; 42 episodes
2003	The Eustace Bros.	Kassidy	Episode #1.6
2005	The Bill	Nicci Villers	Episode: "Honour"
2005	55 Degrees North	Beth Robson	Series 2; 5 episodes
2005	Holby City	Clare Given	Episode: "View from the Sideline"
2005	Coronation Street	Robyn	18 episodes
2006	EastEnders	DI Skillen	Episode #1.3136
2007	Casualty	Carrie Morgan	Episode: "The Fires Within"
2008	Doctors	Kay McLeod	Series 10; 14 episodes
2009	Inspector George Gently	Helen Donovan	Episode: "Gently in the Night"
2009	The Bill	Maxine Clements	Episode: "Powerless"
2011	The Shadow Line	Laura Gabriel	Mini-series; 7 episodes
2011	Downton Abbey	Jane Moorsum	Series 2; 4 episodes
2012	Casualty	Paige Norton	Episode: "Fools for Love"
2012	Midsomer Murders	Catrina Harper	Episode: "Written in the Stars"
2012–2014	Vera	DC Rebecca 'Shep' Shepherd	Recurring role; 7 episodes
2014	Silent Witness	Lizzie Kennedy	Episode: "Fraternity: Parts 1 & 2"
2015–2016	Home Fires	Steph Farrow	Series 1 & 2; 12 episodes
2016	DCI Banks	Alice Finn	Episodes: "To Burn in Every Drop of Blood: Parts 1 & 2"
2017	Little Boy Blue	Helen Morris	Mini-series; 3 episodes
2017	Broken	Mariella	Episodes: "Christina" & "Helen"
2018	The Alienist	Mrs. Zweig	Episode: "The Boy on the Bridge"
2018	Requiem	PC Graves	Mini-series; 5 episodes
2018	The Innocents	Nurse Deborah Hale	Episode: "Deborah"
2019	Baptiste	Clare	4 episodes
2020	Strike Back	Dr. Thurman	Episode: "Vendetta: Part 6"
2021	Unforgotten	Anna Sidhu	Series 4; 6 episodes
2022	Anne	Sheila Coleman	Mini-series; 3 episodes
2022, 2024	Tell Me Everything	Ann	Series 1 & 2; 9 episodes
2022–2025	Grace	Sandy Grace	Series 2–5; 9 episodes
2023	The Family Pile	Yvette	6 episodes
2023	Smother	Cheryl	Series 3; 4 episodes
2024	Mr Bates vs The Post Office	Gina Griffiths	Mini-series; episode 3
2024	The Jetty	Joan Owen	Mini-series; 4 episodes
2024	A Very Royal Scandal	Sam McAlister	Mini-series; 3 episodes
2026	Power: The Downfall of Huw Edwards	Victoria Newton	Television film
2026	The Chelsea Detective	Betina	Episode #4.1
2026	Tip Toe	Maggie	Mini-series

=== Video games ===
Year	Title	Role (voice)	Notes
2020	South of the Circle	Irene Hamilton	
