= A Room Above a Shop =

2025 novel by Anthony Shapland

A Room Above a Shop is a 2025 novel by Welsh author Anthony Shapland.

== Summary ==
The novel is set in South Wales in the late 1980s. It follows the love story between two men in a time of homophobia in the United Kingdom, notably under Section 28, as well as during the HIV/AIDS pandemic.

== Reception ==
=== Critical reception ===
John Self of The Guardian review the novel positively, saying that it was "memorable, striking, dark, beautiful and one of the best debuts I’ve read in years." Stephen Price of Nation.Cymru wrote that the novel was "something very, very special indeed," saying that it was "a book of deep importance to Wales’ hidden histories, most of which we will never know, we will never bring back, and a glimpse at a world – a thrill and a hurting – so few will ever understand first hand."

=== Awards ===
The novel was named Hay Festival Book of the Year 2025. The novel was also named Welsh Book of the Year 2025 by Waterstones.
