= Martin Huws =

Welsh journalist, novelist and poet (born 20th century)

Martin Huws (born 20th century) is a Welsh journalist, novelist and poet, who writes mainly in the Welsh language.

In August 2026, he won the Crown at the 2026 Pembrokeshire National Eisteddfod. He entered the competition under the name "Fan-go", with a pryddest (free-verse poem) on the subject "Adnabod" ("Recognition"). The competition aroused controversy when it was revealed that Huw Edwards had submitted an entry.

== Early life and education ==
Huws attended Cathays High School in Cardiff before studying at Cardiff University.

== Career ==
As a journalist, he worked on publications including Golwg magazine and the Western Mail newspaper before joining ITV Wales. In 1994, he joined BBC Cymru. He was an official of the National Union of Journalists at BBC Wales. With Huw Edwards and others, he produced a pamphlet for the UK's Low Pay Unit in 1998.

His novel Mae Heddwch yn Brifo came second in the Daniel Owen Memorial Prize competition (Gwobr Goffa Daniel Owen) at the 2007 National Eisteddfod of Wales.

=== Publications ===
- Dim Niwed, Gwasg Carreg Gwalch, 2003
- Mae Heddwch yn Brifo (Peace Hurts), Y Lolfa
- Sgrech Rhyfel (short stories), Gwasg Carreg Gwalch, 2002
- Yr Awyr yn Troi'n Inc. (short stories), Gwasg Carreg Gwalch, 2018
- Dyn ar Dân (poetry). 2024

== Personal life ==
Huws lives in Taff's Well.
