= Scribblertown =

Novel by Mary Burdett-Jones

- Author: Mary Burdett-Jones
- Language: Welsh, English
- Published: January 2026 (Welsh), June 2026 (english)
- Publisher: Melin Bapur
- Publication place: Wales
- Pages: 166
- ISBN: 9781917237901

Scribblertown is a 2026 novel in English by Welsh author Mary Burdett-Jones that was originally published in Welsh under the title Llanllenorion. Both versions were published by Melin Bapur; the English version is the author's own translation of the Welsh original.

== Summary ==
The author worked on the book for approximately ten years. An early version was viewed by critic Bobi Jones.

The novel is an experimental one in the Welsh context that combines a range of characters in a seaside University town that is unnamed in the novel, but has been acknowledged by the author as being modelled on Aberystwyth. It incorporates a large quantity of poetry as part of the text, some of which had previously been published by the author, alongside stream of consciousness-like elements, a dream-like sequence, and what one reviewer described as a critical essay on Saunders Lewis and the Tân yn Llŷn controversy.

== Reception ==
Describing an early draft viewed before his death, Bobi Jones had named the novel a "very substantial work." The novel has been described as "challenging and innovative." Writing in the Welsh-language magazine Barn, reviewer Andrew Green praised the novel's ambition.

== Other ==
The cover features the work of Gordon Miles, a local artist.
