= Navajo Star Wars =

- Directed by: Ellyn Stern
- Production companies: Lucasfilm; Deluxe Media; Epcar Entertainment
- Release date: July 3, 2013
- Country: United States
- Language: Navajo

Navajo Star Wars (Sǫʼtah Anaaʼ: Siih Náhásdlįį as a translation of Star Wars: A New Hope) is a Navajo language version of the original 1977 Star Wars film. It was the first ever major feature film to be dubbed into Navajo, or any Native American language.

== Background ==
The original Star Wars film was directed by George Lucas and released in May 1977. Following the release of three prequels in 1999, 2002 and 2005 the original film was renamed Star Wars: Episode IV – The New Hope.

Since 1977, words and phrases from Star Wars have become common part of the English language. The Navajo Star Wars was the 40th film to be dubbed into another language.

The project to dub the film into Navajo was the initiative of Manuelito 'Manny' Wheeler, director of the Navajo Nation Museum, who had spent 16 years persuading Lucasfilm to run with the idea, before finally getting the go ahead in 2012. The aim was to encourage young people to learn and use the Navajo language.

== Voice cast ==
- Terry Teller as Luke Skywalker
- Clarissa Yazzie as Princess Leia
- James Junes as Han Solo
- Marvin Yellowhair as Darth Vader
- Geri Hongeva as C-3PO
- Anderson Kee as Obi-Wan Kenobi
- Jame Bilagody as Grand Moff Tarkin

== Production ==
Members of the voice cast were chosen via an audition process of Navajo speakers, with over 100 people applying for the 14 main character parts (and 20 extras). Auditions took place on May 3-4, 2013.

A translation team, also involving the actors in a "highly negotiative" process, developed the script. Though Navajo is an incredibly descriptive language, there were no words to describe modern concepts, such as "spaceship".

Shana Priesz of production company Deluxe Media described the project as "among the most significant ...we have the unique privilege of contributing to the preservation of a storied and noble culture."

== Release ==
The newly-dubbed film was shown for the first time on July 3, 2013, at the Navajo Nation Reservation in Arizona.
