= Prifardd =

Welsh title awarded to bards

Chair winner Gerallt Lloyd Owen (left) and Crown winner Elwyn Roberts (right), at the 1975 Criccieth eisteddfod

Y Prifardd (Welsh for 'the chief bard') is the Welsh title given to bards who have won either the chair or the crown in the National Eisteddfod of Wales. It is a very highly respected title in the Welsh language community, due to an acknowledgement of the artistic talent required to acquire it. Prifardd is used both as a common noun ("he is a prifardd"), for which the plural is prifeirdd, and as an honorific that precedes the title-holder's name in the way that 'The Reverend' or 'The Honourable' would be used in English; for example, "Y Prifardd Christine James".

For lists of chaired and crowned bards, see Chaired Bards (category) and Crowned Bards (category).
