= Emyr Lewis (poet) =

Welsh poet and academic (born 1957)

Tomos Emyr Lewis (born 8 October 1957) is a Welsh poet and academic. He has won the Crown at the National Eisteddfod of Wales and has won the Chair on two separate occasions. A lawyer by profession, Lewis was appointed Head of the Department of Law & Criminology at Aberystwyth University in 2019.

Lewis was born in London but brought up in Cardiff, a Welsh speaker and later a prominent campaigner for the strengthening of the position of the Welsh language in legislation. He began his career as a lawyer with Cardiff solicitors Morgan Bruce and Nicholas, and remained with the same firm until his retirement, becoming a partner and later a consultant. He won the Chair at the National Eisteddfod at Neath in 1994. Thirty-two years passed before he won the Chair for a second time, in 2026, when he received the prize for an 'awdl' on the theme "Llinell | Llinellau". Between his two wins, in 1998, he won the Crown for the first and only time.

From 2001 to 2013, he was the UK Representative on COMEX, the Council of Europe’s Committee of Experts under the European Charter for Regional and Minority Languages (2001-2013). He became Senior Fellow in Welsh Law at the Wales Governance Centre at Cardiff University on a part-time basis, holding the position from 2011 to 2014. He has been called "one of the doyens of public and administrative law in Wales".

== Publications ==
- Chwarae Mig (1996)
- Twt Lol (2019)
- Amser amherffaith(2021)
