= Solvent effects =

Influence of a solvent on chemical reactivity, stability, etc.

In chemistry, solvent effects are the influence of a solvent on chemical reactivity or molecular associations. Solvents can have an effect on solubility, stability and reaction rates and choosing the appropriate solvent allows for thermodynamic and kinetic control over a chemical reaction.

A solute dissolves in a solvent when solvent-solute interactions are more favorable than solute-solute interaction.

== Effects on stability ==
Different solvents can affect the equilibrium constant of a reaction by differential stabilization of the reactant or product. The equilibrium is shifted in the direction of the substance that is preferentially stabilized. Stabilization of the reactant or product can occur through any of the different non-covalent interactions with the solvent such as H-bonding, dipole-dipole interactions, van der Waals interactions etc.

=== Acid-base equilibria ===
The ionization equilibrium of an acid or a base is affected by a solvent change. The effect of the solvent is not only because of its acidity or basicity but also because of its dielectric constant and its ability to preferentially solvate and thus stabilize certain species in acid-base equilibria. A change in the solvating ability or dielectric constant can thus influence the acidity or basicity.

Solvent properties at 25 °C
Solvent	Dielectric constant
Acetonitrile	37
Dimethylsulfoxide	47
Water	78

In the table above, it can be seen that water is the most polar-solvent, followed by DMSO, and then acetonitrile. Consider the following acid dissociation equilibrium:

HA ⇌ A^{−} + H^{+}

Water, being the most polar-solvent listed above, stabilizes the ionized species to a greater extent than does DMSO or Acetonitrile. Ionization - and, thus, acidity - would be greatest in water and lesser in DMSO and Acetonitrile, as seen in the table below, which shows pK_{a} values at 25 °C for acetonitrile (ACN) and dimethyl sulfoxide (DMSO) and water.

pK_{a} values of acids
HA ⇌ A^{−} + H^{+}	ACN	DMSO	water
p-Toluenesulfonic acid	8.5	0.9	strong
2,4-Dinitrophenol	16.66	5.1	3.9
Benzoic acid	21.51	11.1	4.2
Acetic acid	23.51	12.6	4.756
Phenol	29.14	18.0	9.99

=== Keto–enol equilibria ===
Keto enol tautomerization (diketo form on left, cis-enol form on right)

Many carbonyl compounds exhibit keto–enol tautomerism. This effect is especially pronounced in 1,3-dicarbonyl compounds that can form hydrogen-bonded enols. The equilibrium constant is dependent upon the solvent polarity, with the cis-enol form predominating at low polarity and the diketo form predominating at high polarity. The intramolecular H-bond formed in the cis-enol form is more pronounced when there is no competition for intermolecular H-bonding with the solvent. As a result, solvents of low polarity that do not readily participate in H-bonding allow cis-enolic stabilization by intramolecular H-bonding.

Solvent	${\mathbf{K}}_\mathrm{T}=\frac{[cis-enol]}{[diketo]}$
Gas phase	11.7
Cyclohexane	42
Tetrahydrofuran	7.2
Benzene	14.7
Ethanol	5.8
Dichloromethane	4.2
Water	0.23

== Effects on reaction rates ==
Often, reactivity and reaction mechanisms are pictured as the behavior of isolated molecules in which the solvent is treated as a passive support. However, the nature of the solvent can actually influence reaction rates and order of a chemical reaction.

Performing a reaction without solvent can affect reaction-rate for reactions with bimolecular mechanisms, for example, by maximizing the concentration of the reagents. Ball milling is one of several mechanochemical techniques where physical methods are used to control reactions in the absence of solvent.

=== Equilibrium-solvent effects ===
Solvents can affect rates through equilibrium-solvent effects that can be explained on the basis of the transition state theory. In essence, the reaction rates are influenced by differential solvation of the starting material and transition state by the solvent. When the reactant molecules proceed to the transition state, the solvent molecules orient themselves to stabilize the transition state. If the transition state is stabilized to a greater extent than the starting material then the reaction proceeds faster. If the starting material is stabilized to a greater extent than the transition state then the reaction proceeds slower. However, such differential solvation requires rapid reorientational relaxation of the solvent (from the transition state orientation back to the ground-state orientation). Thus, equilibrium-solvent effects are observed in reactions that tend to have sharp barriers and weakly dipolar, rapidly relaxing solvents.

=== Frictional solvent effects ===
The equilibrium hypothesis does not stand for very rapid chemical reactions in which the transition state theory breaks down. In such cases involving strongly dipolar, slowly relaxing solvents, solvation of the transition state does not play a very large role in affecting the reaction rate. Instead, dynamic contributions of the solvent (such as friction, density, internal pressure, or viscosity) play a large role in affecting the reaction rate.

=== Hughes–Ingold rules ===
The effect of solvent on elimination and nucleophillic substitution reactions was originally studied by British chemists Edward D. Hughes and Christopher Kelk Ingold. Using a simple solvation model that considered only pure electrostatic interactions between ions or dipolar molecules and solvents in initial and transition states, all nucleophilic and elimination reactions were organized into different charge types (neutral, positively charged, or negatively charged). Hughes and Ingold then made certain assumptions about the extent of solvation to be expected in these situations:

- increasing magnitude of charge will increase solvation
- increasing delocalization will decrease solvation
- loss of charge will decrease solvation more than the dispersal of charge

The applicable effect of these general assumptions are shown in the following examples:

- An increase in solvent polarity accelerates the rates of reactions where a charge is developed in the activated complex from neutral or slightly charged reactant
- An increase in solvent polarity decreases the rates of reactions where there is less charge in the activated complex in comparison to the starting materials
- A change in solvent polarity will have little or no effect on the rates of reaction when there is little or no difference in charge between the reactants and the activated complex.

== Reaction examples ==
=== Substitution reactions ===
The solvent used in substitution reactions inherently determines the nucleophilicity of the nucleophile; this fact has become increasingly more apparent as more reactions are performed in the gas phase. As such, solvent conditions significantly affect the performance of a reaction with certain solvent conditions favoring one reaction mechanism over another. For S_{N}1 reactions the solvent's ability to stabilize the intermediate carbocation is of direct importance to its viability as a suitable solvent. The ability of polar solvents to increase the rate of S_{N}1 reactions is a result of the polar solvents solvating the reactant intermediate species, i.e., the carbocation, thereby decreasing the intermediate energy relative to the starting material. The following table shows the relative solvolysis rates of tert-butyl chloride with acetic acid (CH_{3}CO_{2}H), methanol (CH_{3}OH), and water (H_{2}O).

Solvent	Dielectric Constant, ε	Relative Rate
CH_{3}CO_{2}H	6	1
CH_{3}OH	33	4
H_{2}O	78	150,000

The case for S_{N}2 reactions is quite different, as the lack of solvation on the nucleophile increases the rate of an S_{N}2 reaction. In either case (S_{N}1 or S_{N}2), the ability to either stabilize the transition state (S_{N}1) or destabilize the reactant starting material (S_{N}2) acts to decrease the ΔG^{‡}_{activation} and thereby increase the rate of the reaction. This relationship is according to the equation ΔG = –RT ln K (Gibbs free energy). The rate equation for S_{N}2 reactions are bimolecular being first order in Nucleophile and first order in Reagent. The determining factor when both S_{N}2 and S_{N}1 reaction mechanisms are viable is the strength of the Nucleophile. Nuclephilicity and basicity are linked and the more nucleophilic a molecule becomes the greater said nucleophile's basicity. This increase in basicity causes problems for S_{N}2 reaction mechanisms when the solvent of choice is protic. Protic solvents react with strong nucleophiles with good basic character in an acid/base fashion, thus decreasing or removing the nucleophilic nature of the nucleophile. The following table shows the effect of solvent polarity on the relative reaction rates of the S_{N}2 reaction of 1-bromobutane with azide (N_{3}^{–}). There is a noticeable increase in reaction rate when changing from a protic solvent to an aprotic solvent. This difference arises from acid/base reactions between protic solvents (not aprotic solvents) and strong nucleophiles. While it is true that steric effects also affect the relative reaction rates, however, for demonstration of principle for solvent polarity on S_{N}2 reaction rates, steric effects may be neglected.

Solvent	Dielectric Constant, ε	Relative Rate	Type
CH_{3}OH	33	1	Protic
H_{2}O	78	7	Protic
DMSO	49	1,300	Aprotic
DMF	37	2800	Aprotic
CH_{3}CN	38	5000	Aprotic

A comparison of S_{N}1 to S_{N}2 reactions is to the right. On the left is an S_{N}1 reaction coordinate diagram. Note the decrease in ΔG^{‡}_{activation} for the polar-solvent reaction conditions. This arises from the fact that polar solvents stabilize the formation of the carbocation intermediate to a greater extent than the non-polar-solvent conditions. This is apparent in the ΔE_{a}, ΔΔG^{‡}_{activation}. On the right is an S_{N}2 reaction coordinate diagram. Note the decreased ΔG^{‡}_{activation} for the non-polar-solvent reaction conditions. Polar solvents stabilize the reactants to a greater extent than the non-polar-solvent conditions by solvating the negative charge on the nucleophile, making it less available to react with the electrophile.

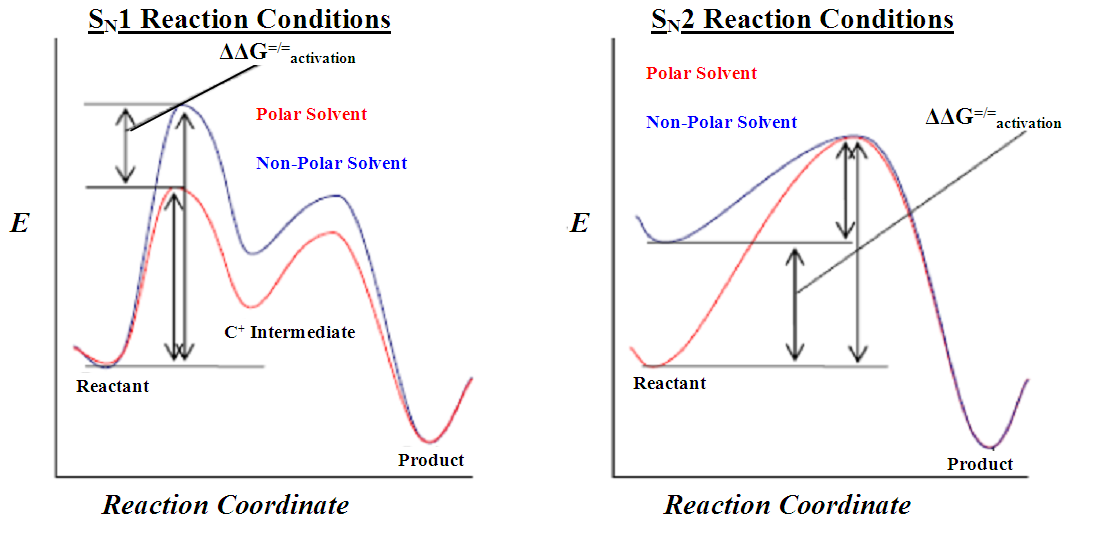
Solvent effects on SN1 and SN2 reactions

=== Transition-metal-catalyzed reactions ===
The reactions involving charged transition metal complexes (cationic or anionic) are dramatically influenced by solvation, especially in the polar media. As high as 30-50 kcal/mol changes in the potential energy surface (activation energies and relative stability) were calculated if the charge of the metal species was changed during the chemical transformation.

=== Free radical syntheses ===
Many free radical-based syntheses show large kinetic solvent effects that can reduce the rate of reaction and cause a planned reaction to follow an unwanted pathway.

== See also ==
- Cage effect
