= Allylic rearrangement =

Type of organic chemical reaction

An allylic rearrangement or allylic shift is an organic chemical reaction in which reaction at a center vicinal to a double bond causes the double bond to shift to an adjacent pair of atoms:

It is encountered in both nucleophilic and electrophilic substitution, although it is usually suppressed relative to non-allylic substitution. For example, reaction of 1-chloro-2-butene with sodium hydroxide gives 2-buten-1-ol and 3-buten-2-ol:

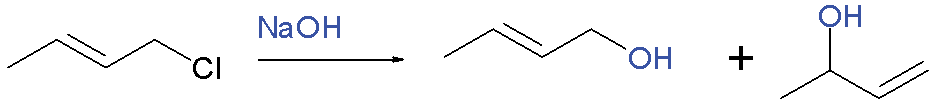

In the similar substitution of 1-chloro-3-methyl-2-butene, the secondary 2-methyl-3-buten-2-ol is produced in a yield of 85%, while that for the primary 3-methyl-2-buten-1-ol is 15%.

Allylic shifts occur because the transition state is an allyl intermediate. In other respects they are similar to classical nucleophilic substitution, and admit both bimolecular and monomolecular mechanisms (respectively the S_{N}2' and S_{N}1'/S_{N}i' substitutions).

== Scope ==
Allylic shifts become the dominant reaction pathway when there is substantial resistance to a normal (non-allylic) substitution. For nucleophilic substitution, such resistance is known when there is substantial steric hindrance at or around the leaving group, or if there is a geminal substituent destabilizing an accumulation of positive charge. The effects of substitution at the vinyl group are less clear. Metal complexes that admit an allyl ligand also catalyze allylic substitution, sometimes to rates exceeding direct substitution.

Although rarer still than S_{N}', allylic shifts can occur vinylogously, as a "butadienylic shift":

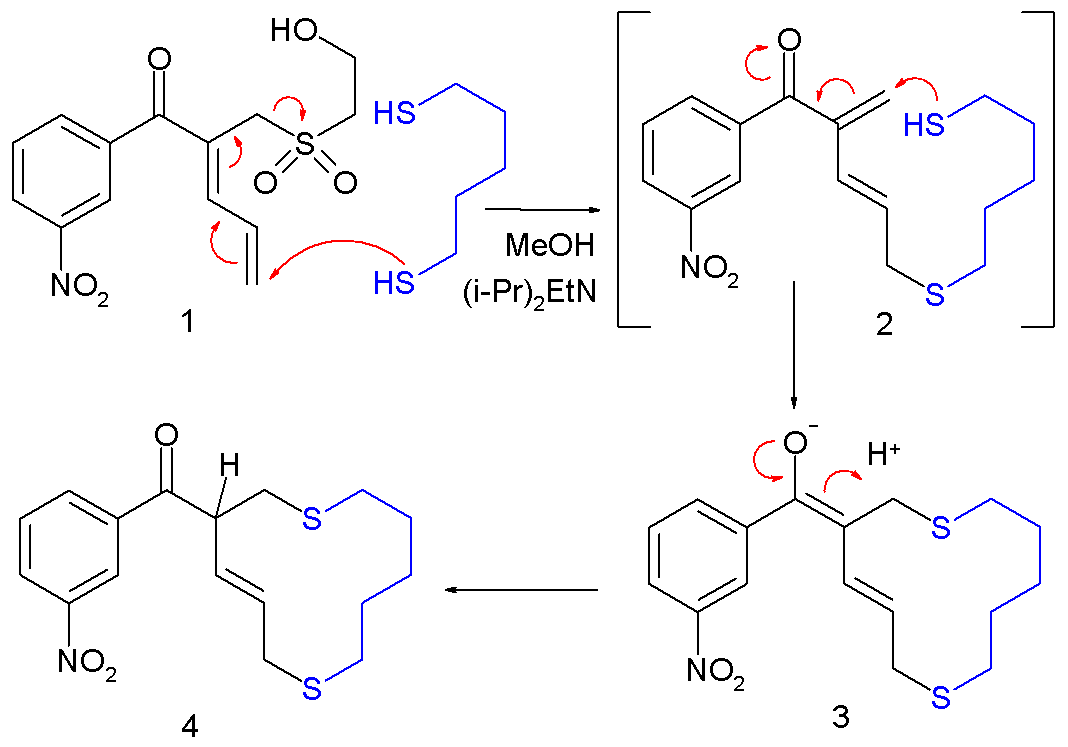
MeOH is methanol solvent; (i‑Pr)_{2}EtN is catalytic diisopropylethylamine

=== S_{N}2' reduction ===
In S_{N}2' reduction, a hydride allylically displaces a good leaving group in a formal organic reduction, similar to the Whiting diene synthesis. One example occurred in taxol total synthesis (ring C):

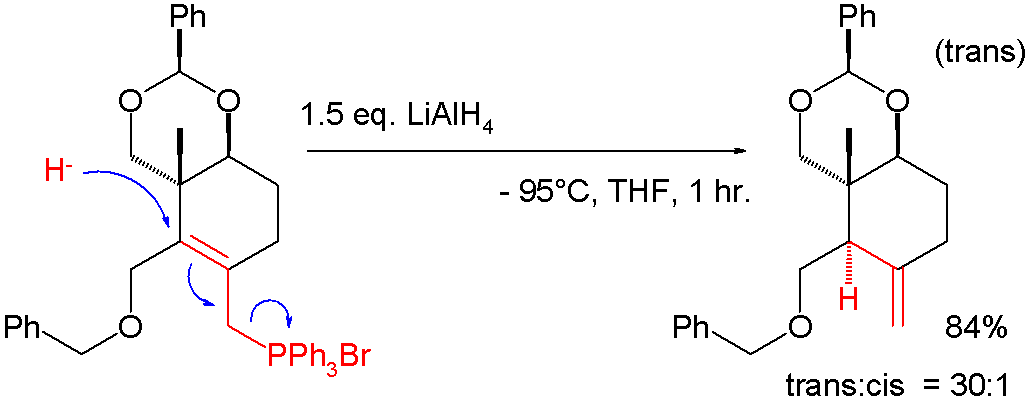

The hydride is lithium aluminium hydride and the leaving group a phosphonium salt; the allylic shift causes the exocyclic double bond in the product. Only when the cyclohexane ring is properly substituted will the proton add trans to the adjacent methyl group.

=== Electrophilic allyl shifts ===
Allyl shifts can also take place with electrophiles. In the example below the carbonyl group in benzaldehyde is activated by diboronic acid prior to reaction with the allyl alcohol (see: Prins reaction):

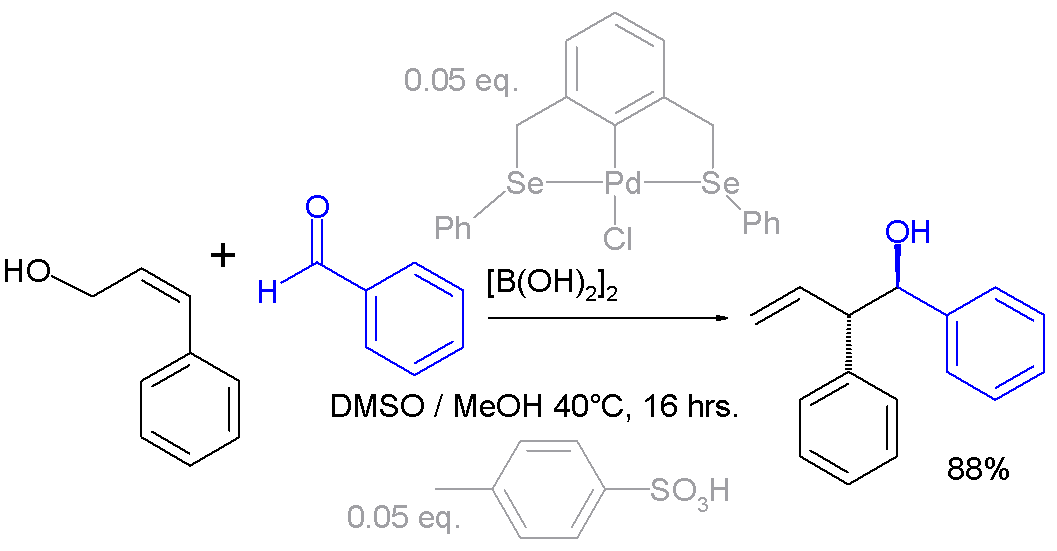

The active catalyst system in this reaction is a combination of a palladium pincer compound and p-toluenesulfonic acid, the reaction product is obtained as a single regioisomer and stereoisomer.

== Examples ==
Repeated allylic shifts can "flip-flop" a double-bond between two possible locations:

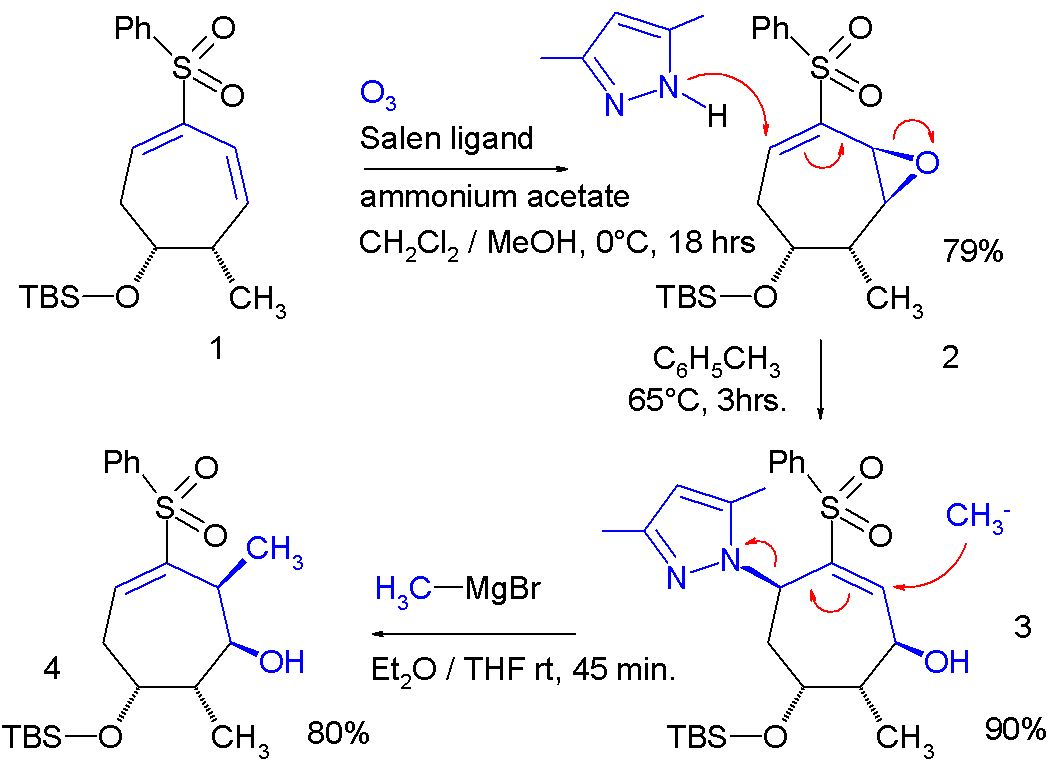

An S_{N}2' reaction should explain the outcome of the reaction of an aziridine carrying a methylene bromide group with methyllithium:

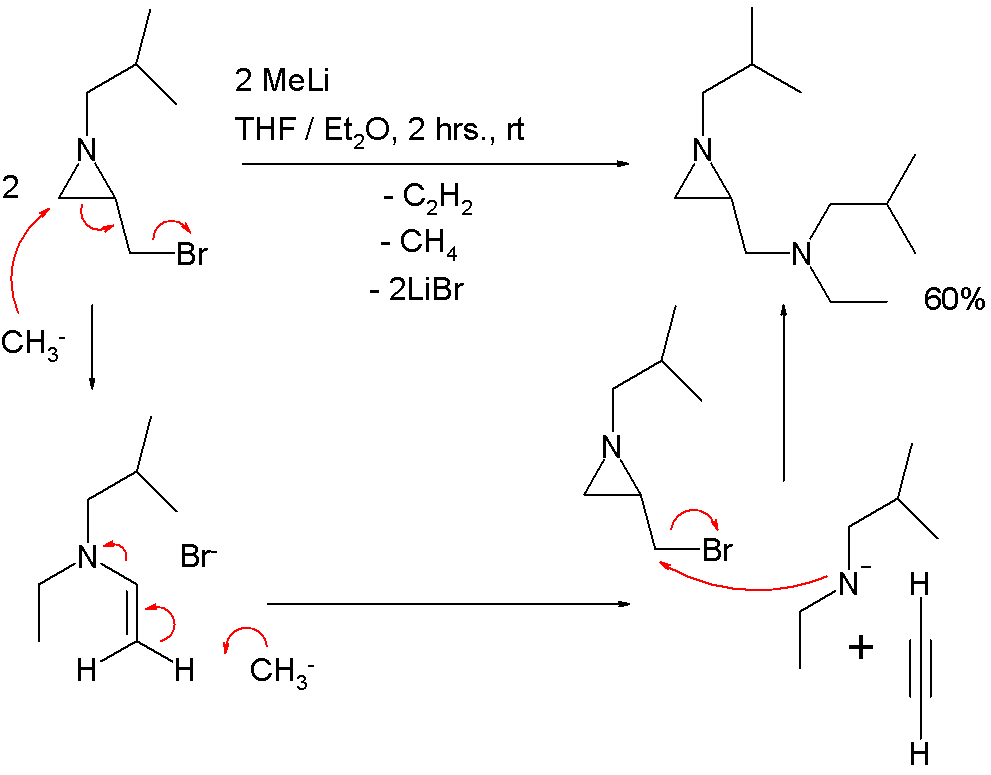

In this reaction one equivalent of acetylene is lost.

=== Named reactions ===
- Ferrier rearrangement
- Meyer–Schuster rearrangement
- Mislow-Evans rearrangement
