= Nucleophilic aromatic substitution =

Chemical reaction mechanism

A nucleophilic aromatic substitution (S_{N}Ar) is a substitution reaction in organic chemistry in which the nucleophile displaces a good leaving group, such as a halide, on an aromatic ring. Aromatic rings are usually nucleophilic, but some aromatic compounds do undergo nucleophilic substitution. Just as normally nucleophilic alkenes can be made to undergo conjugate substitution if they carry electron-withdrawing substituents, so normally nucleophilic aromatic rings also become electrophilic if they have the right substituents.

Aromatic nucleophilic substitution

This reaction differs from a common S_{N}2 reaction, because it happens at a trigonal carbon atom (sp^{2} hybridization). The mechanism of S_{N}2 reaction does not occur due to steric hindrance of the benzene ring. In order to attack the C atom, the nucleophile must approach in line with the C-LG (leaving group) bond from the back, where the benzene ring lies. It follows the general rule for which S_{N}2 reactions occur only at a tetrahedral carbon atom.

The S_{N}1 mechanism is possible but very unfavourable unless the leaving group is an exceptionally good one. It would involve the unaided loss of the leaving group and the formation of an aryl cation. In the S_{N}1 reactions all the cations employed as intermediates were planar with an empty p orbital. This cation is planar but the p orbital is full (it is part of the aromatic ring) and the empty orbital is an sp^{2} orbital outside the ring.

== Nucleophilic aromatic substitution mechanisms ==
Aromatic rings undergo nucleophilic substitution by several pathways.

1. S_{N}Ar (addition-elimination) mechanism
2. aromatic S_{N}1 mechanism encountered with diazonium salts
3. benzyne mechanism (E1cB-Ad_{N})
4. free radical S_{RN}1 mechanism
5. ANRORC mechanism
6. Vicarious nucleophilic substitution

The S_{N}Ar mechanism is the most important of these. Electron withdrawing groups activate the ring towards nucleophilic attack. For example if there are nitro functional groups positioned ortho or para to the halide leaving group, the S_{N}Ar mechanism is favored.

== S_{N}Ar reaction mechanism ==
The following is the reaction mechanism of a nucleophilic aromatic substitution of 2,4-dinitrochlorobenzene (1) in a basic solution in water.

Nucleophilic aromatic substitution

Since the nitro group is an activator toward nucleophilic substitution, and a meta director, it is able to stabilize the additional electron density (via resonance) when the aromatic compound is attacked by the hydroxide nucleophile. The resulting intermediate, named the Meisenheimer complex (2a), the ipso carbon is temporarily bonded to the hydroxyl group. This Meisenheimer complex is extra stabilized by the additional electron-withdrawing nitro group (2b).

In order to return to a lower energy state, either the hydroxyl group leaves, or the chloride leaves. In solution, both processes happen. A small percentage of the intermediate loses the chloride to become the product (2,4-dinitrophenol, 3), while the rest return to the reactant (1). Since 2,4-dinitrophenol is in a lower energy state, it will not return to form the reactant, so after some time has passed, the reaction reaches chemical equilibrium that favors the 2,4-dinitrophenol, which is then deprotonated by the basic solution (4).

The formation of the resonance-stabilized Meisenheimer complex is slow because the loss of aromaticity due to nucleophilic attack results in a higher-energy state. By the same coin, the loss of the chloride or hydroxide is fast, because the ring regains aromaticity. Recent work indicates that, sometimes, the Meisenheimer complex is not always a true intermediate but may be the transition state of a 'frontside S_{N}2' process, particularly if stabilization by electron-withdrawing groups is not very strong. A 2019 review argues that such 'concerted S_{N}Ar' reactions are more prevalent than previously assumed.

Aryl halides cannot undergo the classic 'backside' S_{N}2 reaction. The carbon-halogen bond is in the plane of the ring because the carbon atom has a trigonal planar geometry. Backside attack is blocked and this reaction is therefore not possible. An S_{N}1 reaction is possible but very unfavourable. It would involve the unaided loss of the leaving group and the formation of an aryl cation. The nitro group is the most commonly encountered activating group, other groups are the cyano and the acyl group. The leaving group can be a halogen or a sulfide. With increasing electronegativity the reaction rate for nucleophilic attack increases. This is because the rate-determining step for an S_{N}Ar reaction is attack of the nucleophile and the subsequent breaking of the aromatic system; the faster process is the favourable reforming of the aromatic system after loss of the leaving group. As such, the following pattern is seen with regard to halogen leaving group ability for S_{N}Ar: F > Cl ≈ Br > I (i.e. an inverted order to that expected for an S_{N}2 reaction). If looked at from the point of view of an S_{N}2 reaction this would seem counterintuitive, since the C-F bond is amongst the strongest in organic chemistry, when indeed the fluoride is the ideal leaving group for an S_{N}Ar due to the extreme polarity of the C-F bond. Nucleophiles can be amines, alkoxides, sulfides and stabilized carbanions.

== Nucleophilic aromatic substitution reactions ==
Some typical substitution reactions on arenes are listed below.

- In the Bamberger rearrangement N-phenylhydroxylamines rearrange to 4-aminophenols. The nucleophile is water.
- The Smiles rearrangement is the intramolecular version of this reaction type.

Nucleophilic aromatic substitution is not limited to arenes, however; the reaction takes place even more readily with heteroarenes. Pyridines are especially reactive when substituted in the aromatic ortho position or aromatic para position because then the negative charge is effectively delocalized at the nitrogen position. One classic reaction is the Chichibabin reaction (Aleksei Chichibabin, 1914) in which pyridine is reacted with an alkali-metal amide such as sodium amide to form 2-aminopyridine.

In the compound methyl 3-nitropyridine-4-carboxylate, the meta nitro group is actually displaced by fluorine with cesium fluoride in DMSO at 120 °C.

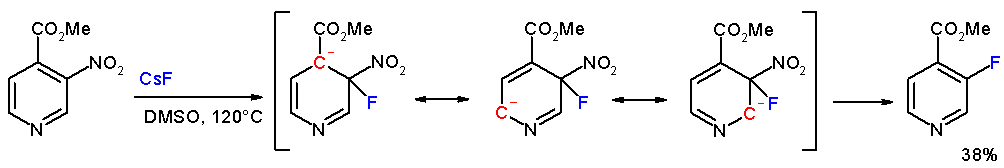
Nucleophilic aromatic substitution at pyridine

Although the Sandmeyer reaction of diazonium salts and halides is formally a nucleophilic substitution, the reaction mechanism is in fact radical.

== Asymmetric nucleophilic aromatic substitution ==
With carbon nucleophiles such as 1,3-dicarbonyl compounds the reaction has been demonstrated as a method for the asymmetric synthesis of chiral molecules. First reported in 2005, the organocatalyst (in a dual role with that of a phase transfer catalyst) is derived from cinchonidine (benzylated at N and O).

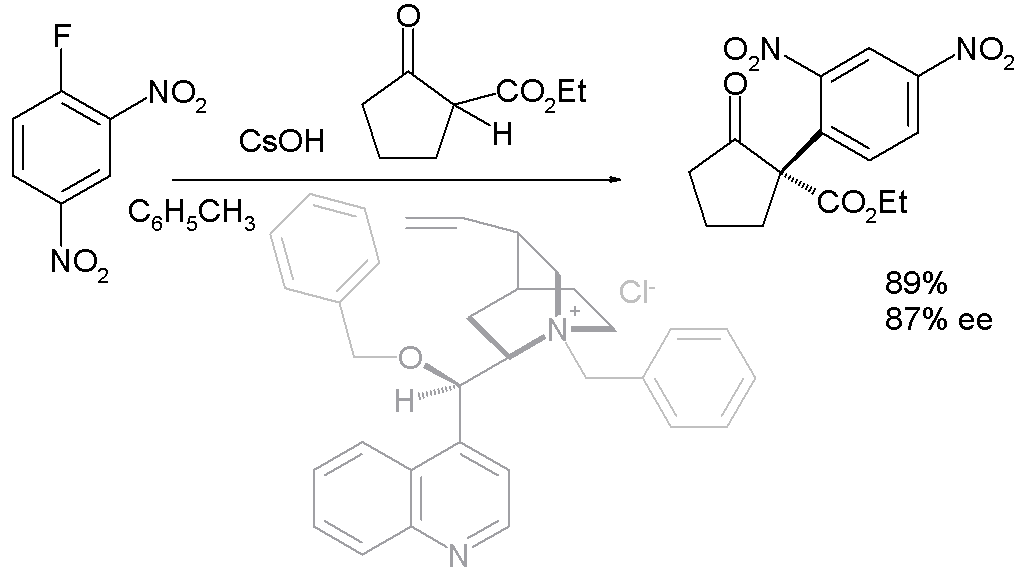

== See also ==
- Electrophilic aromatic substitution
- Nucleophile
- Substitution reaction
- SN1 reaction
- SN2 reaction
- SNi reaction
- Nucleophilic aliphatic substitution
