= Elimination reaction =

Type of organic chemical reaction

Elimination reaction of cyclohexanol to cyclohexene with sulfuric acid and heat

An elimination reaction is a type of organic reaction in which two substituents are removed from a molecule in either a one- or two-step reaction mechanism. The most common types of reaction mechanisms are a one-step mechanism known as the E2 reaction and a two-step mechanism is known as the E1 reaction. The numbers in the Hughes–Ingold symbols refer not to the number of steps in the mechanism, but rather to the molecularity of the reaction kinetics: E2 is bimolecular (second-order) while E1 is unimolecular (first-order). In cases where the molecule is able to stabilize an anion but possesses a poor leaving group, a third type of reaction, E1_{CB}, exists. Finally, the pyrolysis of xanthate and acetate esters proceed through an "internal" elimination mechanism, the E_{i} mechanism. All of these reactions involve loss of sigma bonded groups to form a pi bond on the structure, such as loss of hydrogen and halogen atoms from an alkane to form an alkene.

== E2 mechanism ==
The E2 mechanism is a bimolecular elimination. It involves a one-step mechanism, and has the following characteristics:

- It is typically undergone by primary substituted alkyl halides, but is possible with some secondary alkyl halides and other compounds.
- The reaction rate is second order, because it is influenced by both the alkyl halide and the base (bimolecular).
- Because the E2 mechanism results in the formation of a pi bond, the two leaving groups (often a hydrogen and a halogen) need to be antiperiplanar. An antiperiplanar transition state has staggered conformation with lower energy than a synperiplanar transition state which is in eclipsed conformation with higher energy. The reaction mechanism involving staggered conformation is more favorable for E2 reactions (unlike E1 reactions).
- E2 typically uses a strong base. It must be strong enough to remove a weakly acidic hydrogen.
- In order for the pi bond to be formed, the hybridization of carbons needs to be lowered from sp^{3} to sp^{2}.
- The C-H bond is weakened in the rate determining step and therefore a primary deuterium isotope effect much larger than 1 (commonly 2-6) is observed.
- E2 competes with the S_{N}2 reaction mechanism if the base can also act as a nucleophile (true for many common bases).

Scheme 1: E2 reaction mechanism

An example of this type of reaction in scheme 1 is the reaction of isobutylbromide with potassium ethoxide in ethanol. The reaction products are isobutene, ethanol and potassium bromide.

== E1 mechanism ==
The E1 mechanism is a unimolecular elimination. It involves a two-step mechanism:

1. Ionization: the carbon-halogen bond breaks to give a carbocation intermediate.
2. Deprotonation of the carbocation.

E1 reactions have the following characteristics:

- E1 typically takes place with tertiary alkyl halides, but is possible with some secondary alkyl halides.
- The reaction rate is influenced only by the concentration of the alkyl halide because carbocation formation is the slowest step, as known as the rate-determining step. Therefore, first-order kinetics apply (unimolecular).
- The reaction usually occurs in the complete absence of a base or the presence of only a weak base (acidic conditions and high temperature).
- E1 reactions are in competition with S_{N}1 reactions because they share a common carbocationic intermediate.
- A secondary deuterium isotope effect of slightly larger than 1 (commonly 1 - 1.5) is observed.
- There is no antiperiplanar requirement. An example is the pyrolysis of a certain sulfonate ester of menthol:

E1 elimination Nash 2008, antiperiplanar relationship in blue

Only reaction product A results from antiperiplanar elimination. The presence of product B is an indication that an E1 mechanism is occurring.

- It is accompanied by carbocationic rearrangement reactions.

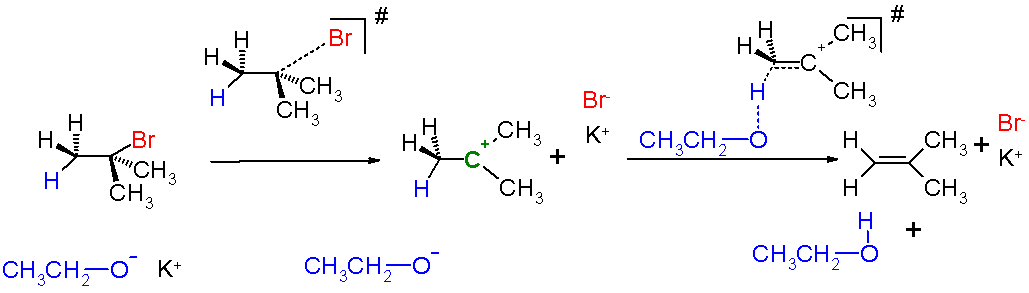
Scheme 2. E1 reaction mechanism

An example in scheme 2 is the reaction of tert-butylbromide with potassium ethoxide in ethanol.

E1 eliminations happen with highly substituted alkyl halides for two main reasons:

- Highly substituted alkyl halides are bulky, limiting the room for the E2 one-step mechanism; therefore, the two-step E1 mechanism is favored.
- Highly substituted carbocations are more stable than methyl or primary substituted cations. Such stability gives time for the two-step E1 mechanism to occur.

If S_{N}1 and E1 pathways are competing, the E1 pathway can be favored by increasing the heat.

Specific features :

1. Rearrangement possible
2. Independent of concentration and basicity of base

== Competition among mechanisms ==
The reaction rate is influenced by the reactivity of halogens, iodide and bromide being favored. Fluoride is not a good leaving group, so eliminations with fluoride as the leaving group have slower rates than other halogens . There is a certain level of competition between the elimination reaction and nucleophilic substitution. More precisely, there are competitions between E2 and S_{N}2 and also between E1 and S_{N}1. Generally, elimination is favored over substitution when

- steric hindrance around the α-carbon increases.
- a stronger base is used.
- temperature increases (increase entropy)
- the base is a poor nucleophile. Bases with steric bulk, (such as in potassium tert-butoxide), are often poor nucleophiles.

For example, when a tertiary haloalkane is reacts with an alkoxide, due to strong basic character of the alkoxide and unreactivity of tertiary group towards S_{N}2, only alkene formation by E2 elimination is observed. Thus, elimination by E2 limits the scope of the Williamson ether synthesis (an S_{N}2 reaction) to essentially only primary haloalkanes; secondary haloalkanes generally do not give synthetically useful yields, while tertiary haloalkanes fail completely.

With strong base, tertiary haloalkanes give elimination by E2. With weak bases, mixtures of elimination and substitution products form by competing S_{N}1 and E1 pathways.

The case of secondary haloalkanes is relatively complex. For strongly basic nucleophiles (pK_{aH} > 11; includes hydroxide, alkoxide, acetylide), the result is generally elimination by E2, while weaker bases that are still good nucleophiles (such as acetate, azide, cyanide, iodide) will give primarily S_{N}2. Finally, weakly nucleophilic species (such as water, alcohols, and carboxylic acids) will give a mixture of S_{N}1 and E1.

For primary haloalkanes with β-branching, E2 elimination is still generally preferred over S_{N}2 for strongly basic nucleophiles. Unhindered primary haloalkanes favor S_{N}2 when the nucleophile is also unhindered. However, strongly basic and hindered nucleophiles favor E2.

In general, with the exception of reactions in which E2 is impossible because β hydrogens are unavailable (e.g. methyl, allyl, and benzyl halides), clean S_{N}2 substitution is hard to achieve when strong bases are used, as alkene products arising from elimination are almost always observed to some degree. On the other hand, clean E2 can be achieved by simply selecting a sterically hindered base (such as potassium tert-butoxide). Similarly, attempts to effect substitution by S_{N}1 almost always result in a product mixture contaminated by some E1 product (again, with the exception of cases where the lack of β hydrogens makes elimination impossible).

In one study the kinetic isotope effect (KIE) was determined for the gas phase reaction of several alkyl halides with the chlorate ion. In accordance with an E2 elimination the reaction with t-butyl chloride results in a KIE of 2.3. The methyl chloride reaction (only S_{N}2 possible) on the other hand has a KIE of 0.85 consistent with a S_{N}2 reaction because in this reaction type the C-H bonds tighten in the transition state. The KIEs for the ethyl (0.99) and isopropyl (1.72) analogues suggest competition between the two reaction modes.

== Elimination reactions other than β-elimination ==
β-Elimination, with loss of electrofuge and nucleofuge on vicinal carbon atoms, is by far the most common type of elimination. The ability to form a stable product containing a C=C or C=X bond, as well as orbital alignment considerations, strongly favors β-elimination over other elimination processes. However, other types are known, generally for systems where β-elimination cannot occur.

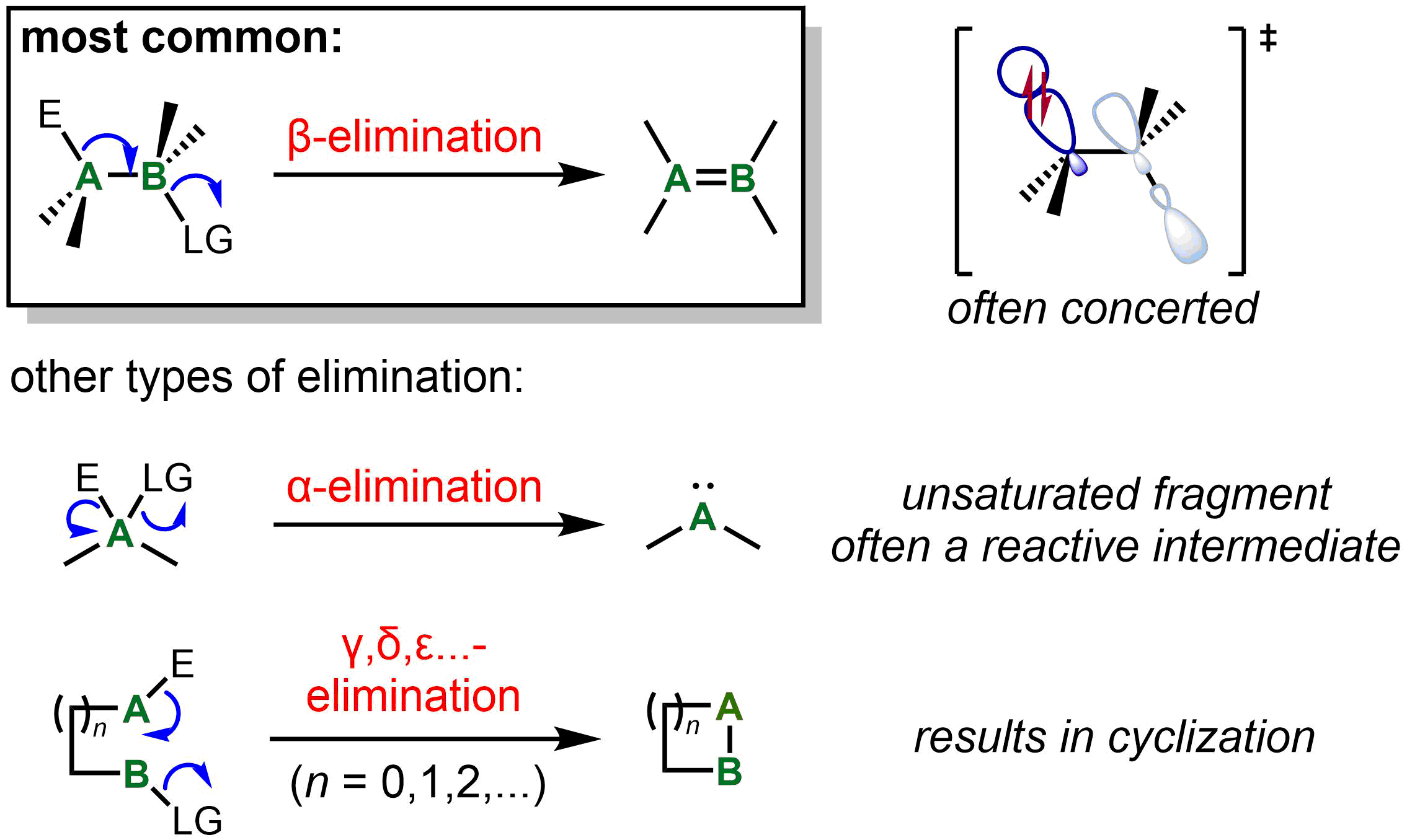

The next most common type of elimination reaction is α-elimination. For a carbon center, the result of α-elimination is the formation of a carbene, which includes "stable carbenes" such as carbon monoxide or isocyanides. For instance, α-elimination the elements of HCl from chloroform (CHCl_{3}) in the presence of strong base is a classic approach for the generation of dichlorocarbene, :CCl_{2}, as a reactive intermediate. On the other hand, formic acid undergoes α-elimination to afford the stable products water and carbon monoxide under acidic conditions. α-elimination may also occur on a metal center, one particularly common result of which is lowering of both the metal oxidation state and coordination number by 2 units in a process known as reductive elimination. (In organometallic terminology, the terms α-elimination and α-abstraction refer to processes that result in formation of a metal-carbene complex. In these reactions, it is the carbon adjacent to the metal that undergoes α-elimination.)

In certain special cases, γ- and higher eliminations to form three-membered or larger rings is also possible in both organic and organometallic processes. For instance, certain Pt(II) complexes undergo γ- and δ-elimination to give metallacycles. More recently, γ-silyl elimination of a silylcyclobutyl tosylate has been used to prepare strained bicyclic systems.

== History ==
Many of the concepts and terminology related to elimination reactions were proposed by Christopher Kelk Ingold in the 1920s.
