= SN1 (disambiguation) =

SN1 may refer to:

- SN1 reaction, a type of organic chemical reaction
- (7990) 1981 SN1, a Main Belt minor planet
- (7058) 1990 SN1, a main-belt minor planet
- a SN postcode for Swindon, England
- Sportsnet One, a Canadian sports channel
