= Hughes–Ingold symbol =

Shorthand notation for chemical processes

A Hughes–Ingold symbol describes various details of the reaction mechanism and overall result of a chemical reaction. For example, an S_{N}2 reaction is a substitution reaction ("S") by a nucleophilic process ("N") that is bimolecular ("2" molecular entities involved) in its rate-determining step. By contrast, an E2 reaction is an elimination reaction, an S_{E}2 reaction involves electrophilic substitution, and an S_{N}1 reaction is unimolecular. The system is named for British chemists Edward D. Hughes and Christopher Kelk Ingold.
