= Arrow pushing =

Technique to describe progression of organic chemistry reaction mechanisms

Arrow pushing or electron pushing is a technique used to describe the progression of organic chemistry reaction mechanisms. It was first developed by Sir Robert Robinson. In using arrow pushing, "curved arrows" or "curly arrows" are drawn on the structural formulae of reactants in a chemical equation to show the reaction mechanism. The arrows illustrate the movement of electrons as bonds between atoms are broken and formed, allowing for a pictorial understanding of the source of electrons in a reaction (nucleophiles), sites to which they are attracted (electrophiles), and atoms or groups where they eventually end up (leaving groups), giving a picture of the overall direction of their movement. Arrow pushing never directly show the movement of atoms; it is used to show the movement of electron density, which indirectly shows the movement of atoms themselves.

Arrow pushing is also used to describe how formal positive and negative charges are redistributed around organic molecules through resonance. It is important to remember, however, that in contrast to the usual goal of showing electron flow in a reaction, the use of arrow pushing to aid in drawing alternative resonance forms of a molecule is purely a formalism for bookkeeping of formal charges and electrons, and no movement of electrons (or rather, electron density) takes place in that case: it is merely a tool to understand how electrons are distributed in a delocalized system.

Arrow pushing has been extended to inorganic chemistry, especially to the chemistry of s- and p-block elements. It has been shown to work well for hypervalent compounds.

== Notation ==
Representation of molecules by molecular formula

The representation of reaction mechanisms using curved arrows to indicate electron flow was developed by Sir Robert Robinson in 1922. Organic chemists use two types of arrows within molecular structures to describe electron movements. Single electrons’ trajectories are designated with single barbed arrows, whereas double-barbed arrows show movement of electron pairs. The arrow's tail is drawn at either a lone pair of electrons on an atom or a bond between atoms, an electron source or area where there is relatively high electron density. Its head points towards electron sinks, or areas of relatively low electron density.

Trajectory of electron pairs

Trajectory of single electron

When a bond is broken, electrons leave where the bond was; this is represented by a curved arrow pointing away from the bond and ending with the arrow pointing towards the next unoccupied molecular orbital. The electrons can be transferred to a specific atom or can be transferred to a single (sigma) bond, thus making it a double (pi) bond, but the arrow is always pointing towards a specific atom, because electrons always move to a new atom whenever they are "pushed". Organic chemists represent the formation of a bond by a curved arrow pointing between two species.

For clarity, when pushing arrows, it is best to draw the arrows starting from a lone pair of electrons or a σ or π bond and ending in a position that can accept a pair of electrons, allowing the reader to know exactly which electrons are moving and where they are ending. Bonds are broken in places where a corresponding antibonding orbital is filled. Some authorities allow the simplification that an arrow can originate at a formal negative charge that corresponds to a lone pair. However, not all formal negative charges correspond to the presence of a lone pair (e.g., the B in F_{4}B^{−}), and care needs to be taken with this usage.

== Breaking of bonds ==
A covalent bond joining atoms in an organic molecule consists of a group of two electrons. Such a group is referred to as an electron pair. Reactions in organic chemistry proceed through the sequential breaking and formation of such bonds. Organic chemists recognize two processes for the breaking of a chemical bond. These processes are known as homolytic cleavage and heterolytic cleavage.

=== Homolytic bond cleavage ===
Homolytic bond cleavage is a process where the electron pair comprising a bond is split, causing the bond to break. This is denoted by two single barbed curved arrows pointing away from the bond. The consequence of this process is the retention of a single unpaired electron denoted by a dot on each of the atoms that were formerly joined by a bond. The single electron movement can be denoted by a curved arrow commonly referred to as a fish hook. These single electron species are known as free radicals. Heat or light are required to provide enough energy for this process to occur.

Homolytic bond cleavage.

For example, Ultraviolet light causes the chlorine-chlorine bond to break homolytically. The pair of electrons become split, denoted by the two fish hook arrows between both atoms pointing to both chlorine atoms. After the reaction occurs, it leads to both chlorine molecules left with a single unpaired electron. This is the initiation stage of free radical halogenation.

Homolytic bond cleavage of chlorine

=== Heterolytic bond cleavage ===
Heterolytic bond cleavage is a process where the electron pair that comprised a bond moves to one of the atoms that was formerly joined by a bond. The bond breaks, forming a negatively charged species (an anion) and a positively charged species (a cation). The anion is the species that retains the electrons from the bond while the cation is stripped of the electrons from the bond. The anion usually forms on the most electronegative atom, in this example atom B. This is because the most electronegative atom will naturally attract electrons towards itself more strongly, leading to its negative charge.

Homolytic bond cleavage.

=== Acid-base reactions ===
A Lewis acid-base reaction occurs when a molecule with a lone electron pair, or a base, donates its electrons to an electron-pair acceptor, also known as an acid. This can be shown in a reaction with a curved arrow pointing from the nonbonding electron pair to the electron acceptor. In a reaction involving Brønsted-Lowry acids and bases, the arrows are used in the same manner, and they help to indicate the attacking proton. In a Brønsted-Lowry acid-base reaction the arrow will begin from the base, the proton acceptor, to the acid, the proton donor.

=== S_{N}1 reactions ===
An S_{N}1 reaction occurs when a molecule separates into a positively charged component and a negatively charged component. This generally occurs in highly polar solvents through a process called solvolysis. The positively charged component then reacts with a nucleophile forming a new compound. S_{N}1 reactions are reactions whose rate is dependent only on haloalkane concentration.

An S_{N}1 reaction. Step 1, solvolysis. Step 2, substitution.

In the first stage of this reaction (solvolysis), the C-L bond breaks and both electrons from that bond join LG (the leaving group) to form LG^{−} and R_{3}C^{+} ions. This is represented by the curved arrow pointing away from the C-LG bond and towards LG. The nucleophile Nu^{−}, being attracted to the R_{3}C^{+}, then donates a pair of electrons forming a new C-Nu bond.

Because an S_{N}1 reaction proceeds with the Substitution of a leaving group with a Nucleophile, the S_{N} designation is used. Because the initial solvolysis step in this reaction involves a single molecule dissociating from its leaving group, the initial stage of this process is considered a uni-molecular reaction. The involvement of only 1 species in the initial phase of the reaction enhances the mechanistic designation to S_{N}1. An S_{N}1 reaction has two steps.

=== S_{N}2 reactions ===
An S_{N}2 reaction occurs when a nucleophile displaces a leaving group residing on a molecule from the backside of the leaving group. This displacement or substitution results in the formation of a substitution product with inversion of stereochemical configuration. The nucleophile forms a bond with its lone pair as the electron source. The electron sink which ultimately accepts the electron density is the nucleofuge (leaving group), with bond forming and bond breaking occurring simultaneously at the transition state (marked with a double-dagger). The rates of S_{N}2 reactions are dependent on the concentration of the haloalkane and the nucleophile.

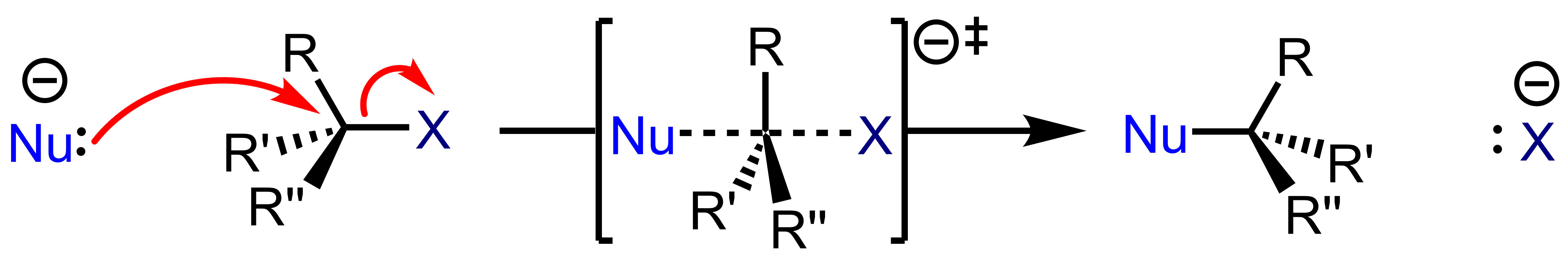

Because an S_{N}2 reaction proceeds with the substitution of a leaving group with a nucleophile, the S_{N} designation is used. Because this mechanism proceeds with the interaction of two species at the transition state, it is referred to as a bimolecular process, resulting in the S_{N}2 designation. An S_{N}2 reaction is a concerted process, which means that the bonds are breaking and forming concurrently. Thus, the electron movement shown by the arrow pushing is happening simultaneously. An S_{N}2 reaction has one step.

=== E1 eliminations ===
An E1 elimination occurs when a proton adjacent to a positive charge leaves and generates a double bond.

Because initial formation of a cation is necessary for E1 reactions to occur, E1 reactions are often observed as side reactions to S_{N}1 mechanisms.

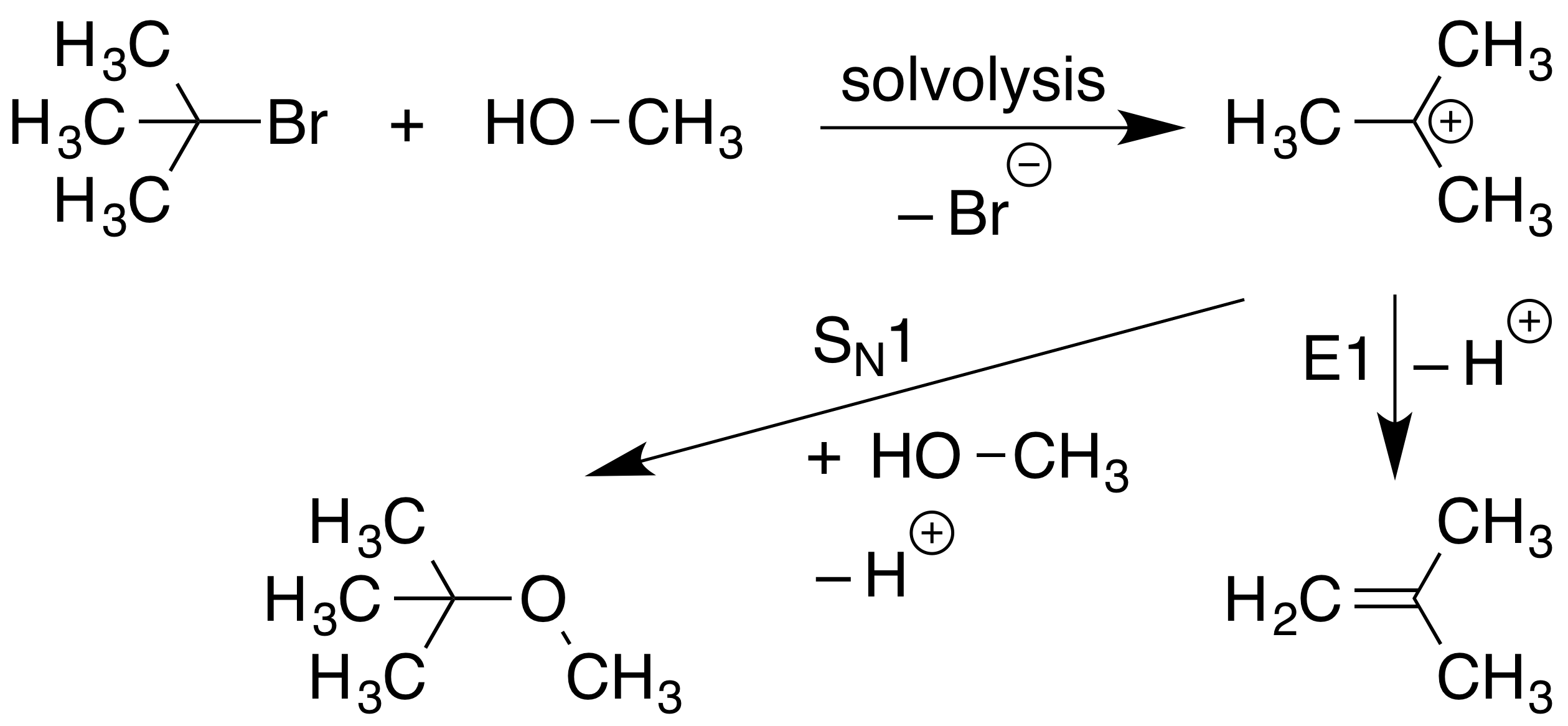

E1 eliminations proceed with the Elimination of a leaving group leading to the E designation. Because this mechanism proceeds with the initial dissociation of a single starting material forming a carbocation, this process is considered a uni-molecular reaction. The involvement of only 1 species in the initial phase of the reaction enhances the mechanistic designation to E1.

=== E2 eliminations ===
An E2 elimination occurs when a proton adjacent to a leaving group is extracted by a base with simultaneous elimination of a leaving group and generation of a double bond.

Similar to the relationship between E1 eliminations and S_{N}1 mechanisms, E2 eliminations often occur in competition with S_{N}2 reactions. This observation is most often noted when the base is also a nucleophile. In order to minimize this competition, non-nucleophilic bases are commonly used to effect E2 eliminations.

E2 eliminations proceed through initial extraction of a proton by a base or nucleophile leading to Elimination of a leaving group justifying the E designation. Because this mechanism proceeds through the interaction of two species (substrate and base/nucleophile), E2 reactions are recognized as bi-molecular. Thus, the involvement of 2 species in the initial phase of the reaction enhances the mechanistic designation to E2.

=== Addition reactions ===
Addition reactions occur when nucleophiles react with carbonyls. When a nucleophile adds to a simple aldehyde or ketone, the result is a 1,2-addition. When a nucleophile adds to a conjugated carbonyl system, the result is a 1,4-addition. The designations 1,2 and 1,4 are derived from numbering the atoms of the starting compound where the oxygen is labeled “1” and each atom adjacent to the oxygen are sequentially numbered out to the site of nucleophilic addition. A 1,2-addition occurs with nucleophilic addition to position 2 while a 1,4-addition occurs with nucleophilic addition to position 4.

=== Addition-elimination reactions ===
Addition-elimination reactions are addition reactions immediately followed by elimination reactions. In general, these reactions take place when esters (or related functional groups) react with nucleophiles. In fact, the only requirement for an addition-elimination reaction to proceed is that the group being eliminated is a better leaving group than the incoming nucleophile.

== See also ==
- Organic reaction
- Reaction mechanism
- S_{N}1 reaction
- S_{N}2 reaction
- Elimination reaction
