= Cage effect =

Behavior of molecules in solvent as encapsulated particles

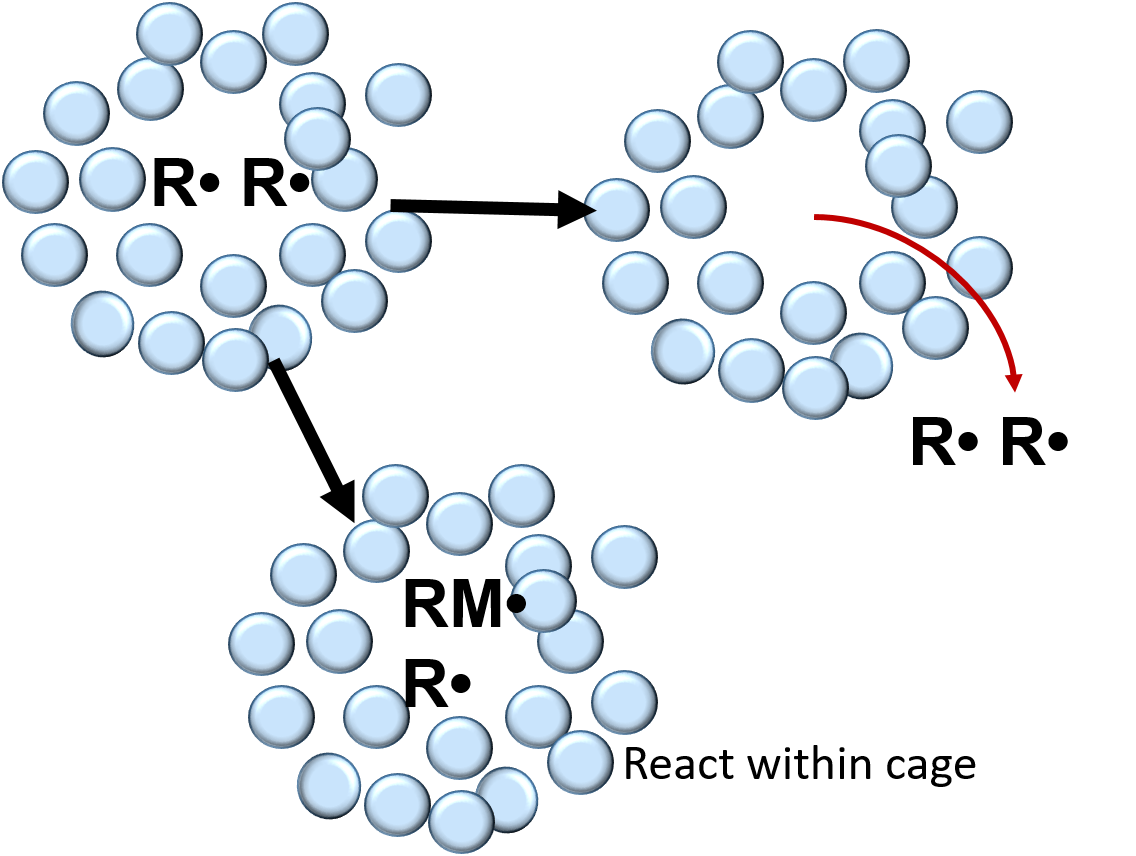
Free radicals in solvent can potentially react with a monomer within the solvent cage or diffuse out.

In chemistry, the cage effect (also known as geminate recombination) describes how the properties of a molecule are affected by its surroundings. First introduced by James Franck and Eugene Rabinowitch in 1934, the cage effect suggests that instead of acting as an individual particle, molecules in solvent are more accurately described as an encapsulated particle. The encapsulated molecules or radicals are called cage pairs or geminate pairs. In order to interact with other molecules, the caged particle must diffuse from its solvent cage.

The typical lifetime of a solvent cage is 10^{-11} seconds.

Many manifestations of the cage effect exist.

== Radical initiator efficiency ==
In free radical polymerization, radicals formed from the decomposition of an initiator molecule are surrounded by a cage consisting of solvent and/or monomer molecules. This can be described by the following reaction:

$R\!-\!R \;\;\underset{k_c}{\overset{k_1}{\rightleftharpoons}}\;\; \underset{\text{cage pair}}{(R^{\,\bullet},^{\bullet}\!R)} \;\;\underset{k_D}{\overset{k_d}{\rightleftharpoons}}\;\; \underset{\text{free radicals}}{2R^{\,\bullet}} \;\rightarrow\; \text{Products}$

The rate of initiation is dependent on how effective the initiator is at escaping the cage. Within the cage, the free radicals undergo many collisions leading to their recombination or mutual deactivation.

The probability of a free radical pair to escape recombination in the cage is 0.1 – 0.01 in solid polymers and 0.3-0.8 in liquids.

The rate of initiation is described as:

$R_i = 2fk_d[I]$

where R_{i} is the rate of initiation, k_{d} is the rate constant for the initiator dissociation reaction $\ce{I2 -> 2I^{.}}$, [I] is the initial concentration of initiator, and f is the efficiency of the initiator at inducing polymerization.Due to the cage effect, free radicals can undergo mutual deactivation which produces stable products instead of initiating propagation – reducing the value of ƒ.

Cage recombination efficiency quantifies the cage effect as F_{c}, where:

$F_c = k_c/(k_c + k_d)$

Here F_{c} is defined as the ratio of the rate constant for cage recombination (k_{c}) to the sum of the rate constants for all cage processes. According to mathematical models, F_{c} is dependent on changes on several parameters including radical size, shape, and solvent viscosity. It is reported that the cage effect will increase with an increase in radical size and a decrease in radical mass.

In unimolecular chemistry, geminate recombination has first been studied in the solution phase using iodine molecules and heme proteins. In the solid state, geminate recombination has been demonstrated with small molecules trapped in noble gas solid matrices and in triiodide crystalline compounds.

== Intimate ion pairs ==
In chemistry, the intimate ion pair concept, introduced by Saul Winstein, describes the interactions between a cation, anion and surrounding solvent molecules. In ordinary aqueous solutions of inorganic salts, an ion is completely solvated and shielded from the counterion. In less polar solvents, two ions can still be connected to some extent. In a tight, intimate, or contact ion pair, there are no solvent molecules between the two ions. When solvation increases, ionic bonding decreases and a loose or solvent-shared ion pair results. The ion pair concept explains stereochemistry in solvolysis.

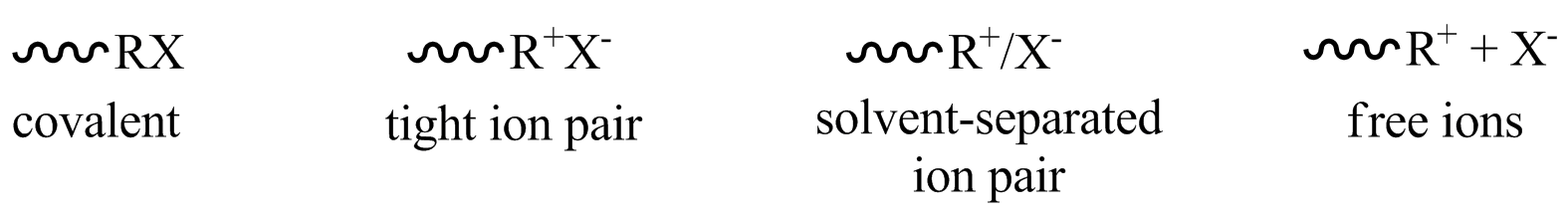

The concept of intimate ion pairs is used to explain the slight tendency for inversion of stereochemistry during an S_{N}1 reaction. It is proposed that solvent or other ions in solution may assist in the removal of a leaving group to form a carbocation which reacts in an S_{N}1 fashion; similarly, the leaving group may associate loosely with the cationic intermediate. The association of solvent or an ion with the leaving group effectively blocks one side of the incipient carbocation, while allowing the backside to be attacked by a nucleophile. This leads to a slight excess of the product with inverted stereochemistry, whereas a purely S_{N}1 reaction should lead to a racemic product. Intimate ion pairs are also invoked in the S_{N}i mechanism. Here, part of the leaving group detaches and attacks from the same face, leading to retention.

== See also ==
- Solvent effects
- Carrier generation and recombination
- Rate-determining step
- Ion association
- Asymmetric ion-pairing catalysis
