= Electrophilic substitution =

Chemical reaction

Electrophilic substitution reactions are chemical reactions in which an electrophile displaces a functional group in a compound, which is typically, but not always, aromatic. Aromatic substitution reactions are characteristic of aromatic compounds and are common ways of introducing functional groups into benzene rings. Some aliphatic compounds can undergo electrophilic substitution as well.

== Electrophilic aromatic substitution ==
In electrophilic substitution in aromatic compounds, an atom appended to the aromatic ring, usually hydrogen, is replaced by an electrophile. The most important reactions of this type that take place are aromatic nitration, aromatic halogenation, aromatic sulfonation and acylation and alkylating Friedel-Crafts reactions. It further consists of alkylation and acylation.

== Electrophilic aliphatic substitution ==
In electrophilic substitution in aliphatic compounds, an electrophile displaces a functional group. This reaction is similar to nucleophilic aliphatic substitution where the reactant is a nucleophile rather than an electrophile. The four possible electrophilic aliphatic substitution reaction mechanisms are S_{E}1, S_{E}2(front), S_{E}2(back) and S_{E}i (Substitution Electrophilic), which are also similar to the nucleophile counterparts S_{N}1 and S_{N}2. In the S_{E}1 course of action the substrate first ionizes into a carbanion and a positively charged organic residue. The carbanion then quickly recombines with the electrophile. The S_{E}2 reaction mechanism has a single transition state in which the old bond and the newly formed bond are both present.

Electrophilic aliphatic substitution reactions are:

- Nitrosation
- Ketone halogenation
- Keto-enol tautomerism
- Aliphatic diazonium coupling
- Carbene insertion into C-H bonds
- Carbonyl alpha-substitution reactions
