= SNi =

Mechanism for nucleophilic substitution reactions

In chemistry, S_{N}i (substitution nucleophilic internal) refers to a specific, regio-selective but not often encountered reaction mechanism for nucleophilic aliphatic substitution. The name was introduced by Cowdrey et al. in 1937 to label nucleophilic reactions which occur with retention of configuration, but later was employed to describe various reactions that proceed with a similar mechanism.

A typical representative organic reaction displaying this mechanism is the chlorination of alcohols with thionyl chloride, or the decomposition of alkyl chloroformates, the main feature is retention of stereochemical configuration. Some examples for this reaction were reported by Edward S. Lewis and Charles E. Boozer in 1952. Mechanistic and kinetic studies were reported few years later by various researchers.

Thionyl chloride first reacts with the alcohol to form an alkyl chloro sulfite, actually forming an intimate ion pair. The second step is the loss of a sulfur dioxide molecule and its replacement by the chloride, which was attached to the sulphite group. The difference between S_{N}1 and S_{N}i is actually that the ion pair is not completely dissociated, and therefore no real carbocation is formed, which else would lead to a racemisation.

This reaction type is linked to many forms of neighbouring group participation, for instance the reaction of the sulfur or nitrogen lone pair in sulfur mustard or nitrogen mustard to form the cationic intermediate.

This reaction mechanism is supported by the observation that addition of pyridine to the reaction leads to inversion. The reasoning behind this finding is that pyridine reacts with the intermediate sulfite replacing chlorine. The dislodged chlorine has to resort to nucleophilic attack from the rear as in a regular nucleophilic substitution.

In the complete picture for this reaction the sulfite reacts with a chlorine ion in a standard S_{N}2 reaction with inversion of configuration. When the solvent is also a nucleophile such as dioxane two successive S_{N}2 reactions take place and the stereochemistry is again retention. With standard S_{N}1 reaction conditions the reaction outcome is retention via a competing S_{N}i mechanism and not racemization and with pyridine added the result is again inversion.

S_{N}i reaction mechanism Sn1 occurs in tertiary carbon while Sn2 occurs in primary carbon

== See also ==
- Nucleophilic acyl substitution
