= Anti-periplanar =

Bond arrangement in organic chemistry

In organic chemistry, anti-periplanar, or antiperiplanar, describes the A−B−C−D bond angle in a molecule. In this conformer, the dihedral angle of the A−B bond and the C−D bond is greater than +150° or less than −150° (Figures 1 and 2). Anti-periplanar is often used in textbooks to mean strictly anti-coplanar, with an A−B C−D dihedral angle of 180° (Figure 3). In a Newman projection, the molecule will be in a staggered arrangement with the anti-periplanar functional groups pointing up and down, 180° away from each other (see Figure 4). Figure 5 shows 2-chloro-2,3-dimethylbutane in a sawhorse projection with chlorine and a hydrogen anti-periplanar to each other.

Syn-periplanar or synperiplanar is similar to anti-periplanar. In the syn-periplanar conformer, the A and D are on the same side of the plane of the bond, with the dihedral angle of A−B and C−D between +30° and −30° (see Figure 2).

Figure 1: Functional groups A and D are anti-periplanar

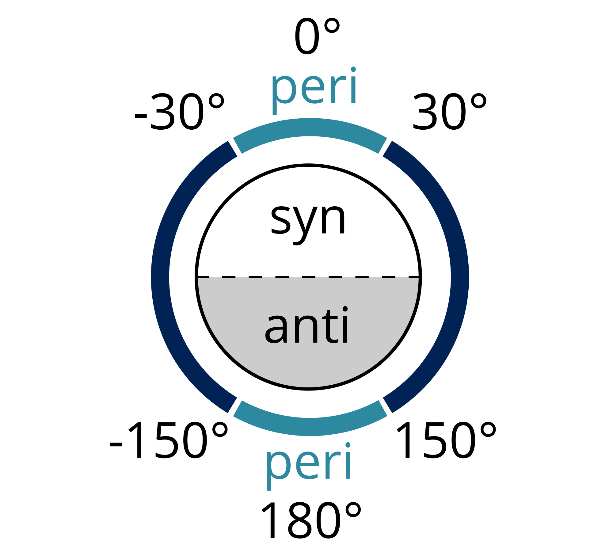
Figure 2: Functional groups are considered periplanar if they have a dihedral angle less than −150° or greater than +150° or −30° to +30°. Adapted from a figure by Dreamtheater published on Wikimedia Commons.

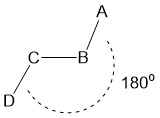
Figure 3: Representation of a strictly anti-coplanar conformation. A, B, C, and D are in the same plane and the dihedral angle between A–B and C–D is 180°.

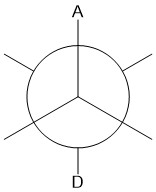
Figure 4: Newman projection showing A and D anti-periplanar.

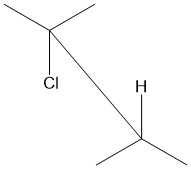
Figure 5: Sawhorse projection of 2-chloro-2,3-dimethylbutane showing Cl and H anti-periplanar.

== Molecular orbitals ==
An important factor in the antiperiplanar conformer is the interaction between molecular orbitals. Anti-periplanar geometry will put a bonding orbital and an anti-bonding orbital approximately parallel to each other, or syn-periplanar. Figure 6 is another representation of 2-chloro-2,3-dimethylbutane (Figure 5), showing the C–H bonding orbital, σ_{C–H}, and the C–Cl anti-bonding orbital, σ*_{C–Cl}, syn-periplanar. The parallel orbitals can overlap and become involved in hyperconjugation. If the bonding orbital is an electron donor and the anti-bonding orbital is an electron acceptor, then the bonding orbital will be able to donate electronegativity into the anti-bonding orbital. This filled-to-unfilled donor-acceptor interaction has an overall stabilizing effect on the molecule. However, donation from a bonding orbital into an anti-bonding orbital will also result in the weakening of both of those bonds. In Figure 6, 2-chloro-2,3-dimethylbutane is stabilized through hyperconjugation from electron donation from σ_{C-H} into σ*_{C-Cl}, but both C–H and C–Cl bonds are weakened. A molecular orbital diagram shows that the mixing of σ_{C–H} and σ*_{C–Cl} in 2-chloro-2,3-dimethylbutane lowers the energy of both the orbitals (Figure 7).

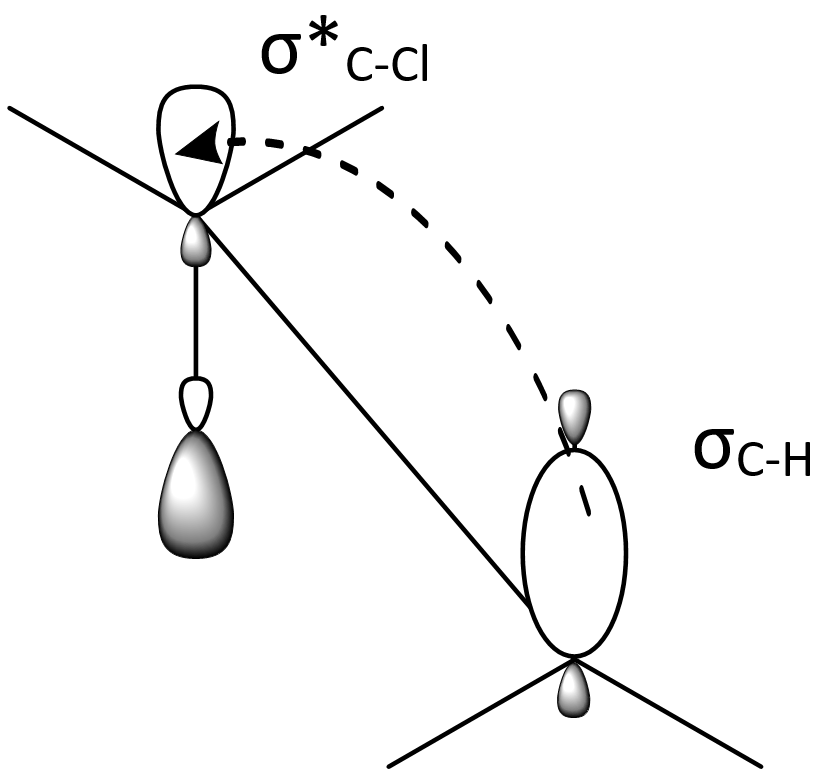
Figure 6: The C–H bonding orbital is aligned with the anti-bonding orbital of C–Cl and can donate into the anti-bonding orbital through hyperconjugation.

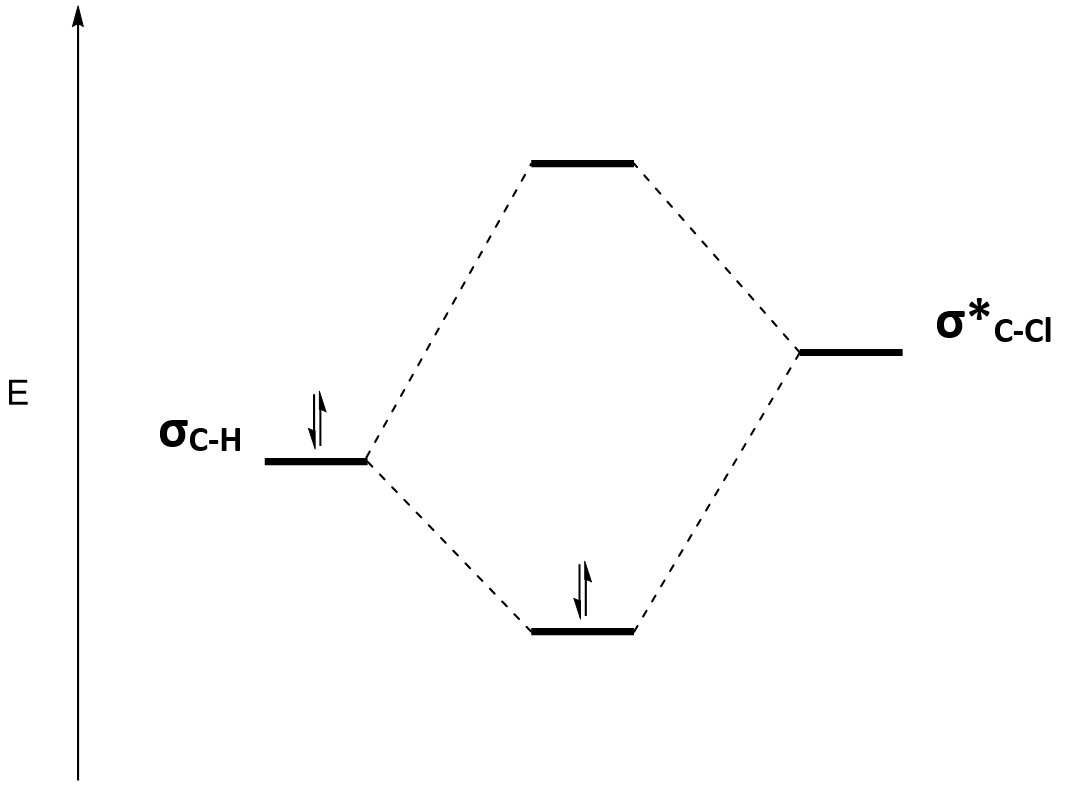
Figure 7: The energy of both the C–H bonding orbital and the C–Cl anti-bonding orbital lower when they mix.

== Examples of anti-periplanar geometry in mechanisms ==
=== E_{2} mechanism ===
A bimolecular elimination reaction will occur in a molecule where the breaking carbon-hydrogen bond and the leaving group are anti-periplanar (Figure 8). This geometry is preferred because it aligns σ_{C-H} and σ*_{C-X} orbitals. Figure 9 shows the σ_{C-H} orbital and the σ*_{C-X} orbital parallel to each other, allowing the σ_{C-H} orbital to donate into the σ*_{C-X} anti-bonding orbital through hyperconjugation. This serves to weaken C-H and C-X bond, both of which are broken in an E_{2} reaction. It also sets up the molecule to more easily move its σ_{C-H} electrons into a π_{C-C} orbital (Figure 10).

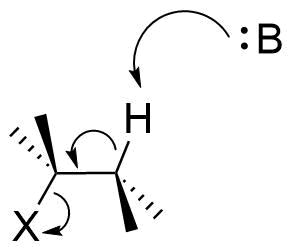
Figure 8: In an E_{2} mechanism, the breaking C–H bond and the leaving group are often anti-periplanar. In the Figure B is a general base and X is a leaving group.

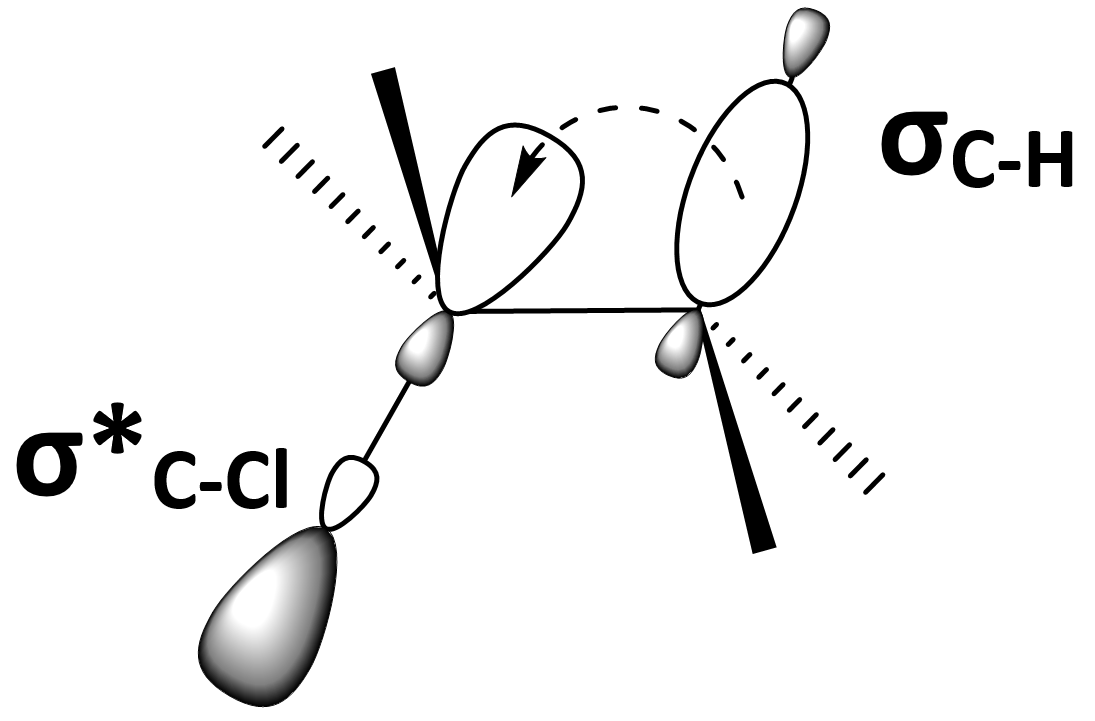
Figure 9: The C–H bonding orbital is mixing with the C–X anti-bonding orbital through hyperconjugation.

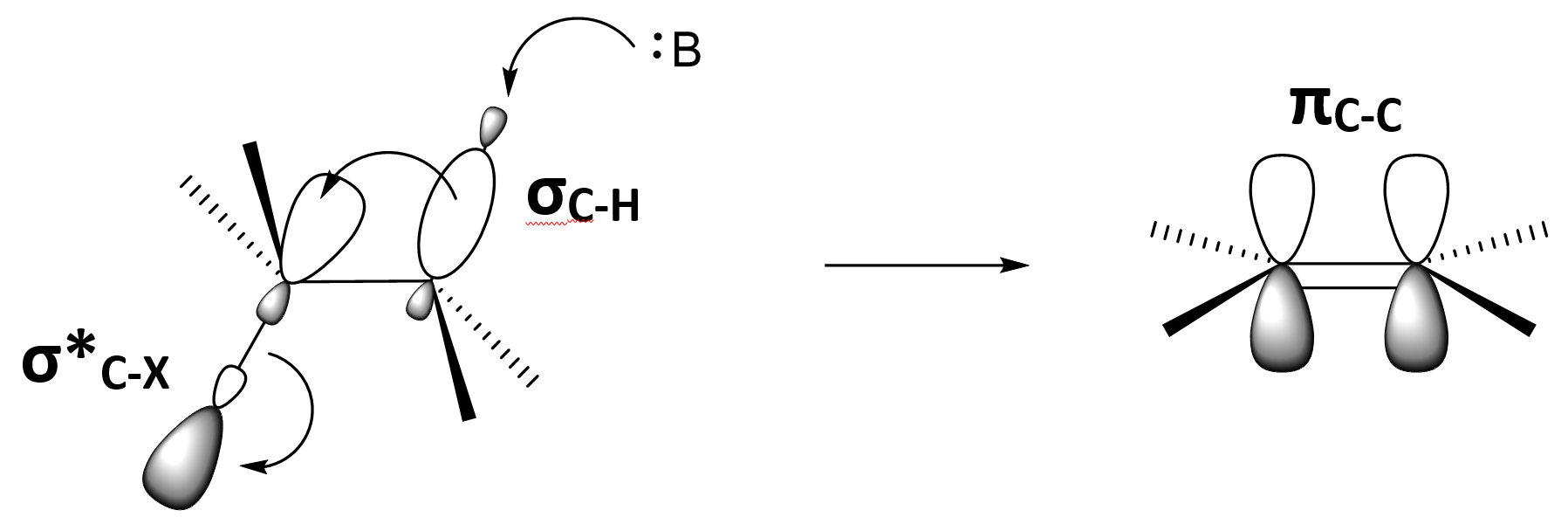
Figure 10: In an E_{2} mechanism molecules generally prefer an anti-periplanar geometry because it aligns molecular orbitals and sets up the molecule to move electrons in a C–H bonding orbital into a π_{C-C} bonding orbital.

=== Pinacol rearrangement ===
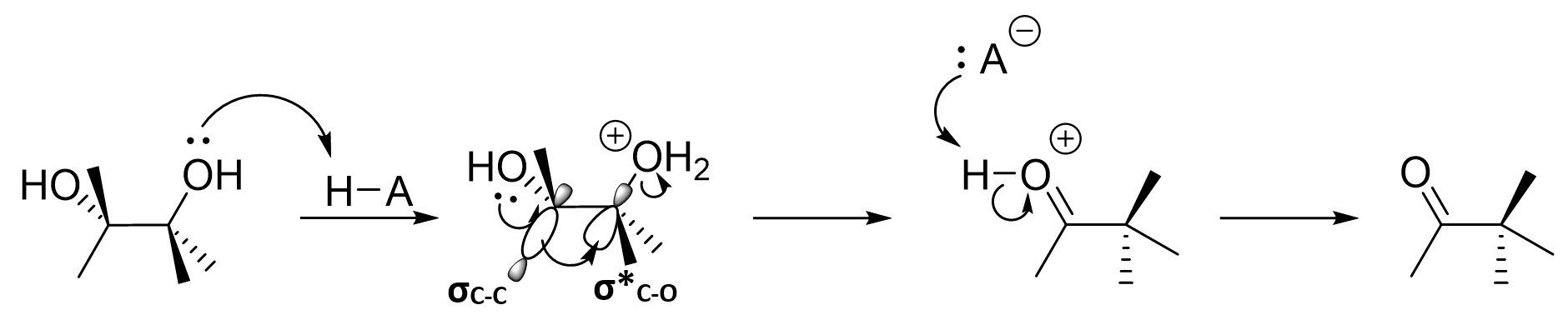
Figure 11: Mechanism of a pinacol rearrangement. The C–C bonding orbital is aligned with the C–O anti-bonding orbital, which facilitates the methyl shift. H–A is a generic acid.

In the pinacol rearrangement, a methyl group is found anti-periplanar to an activated alcohol functional group. This places the σ_{C–C} orbital of the methyl group parallel with the σ*_{C–O} orbital of the activated alcohol. Before the activated alcohol leaves as H_{2}O the methyl bonding orbital donates into the C–O antibonding orbital, weakening both bonds. This hyperconjugation facilitates the 1,2-methyl shift that occurs to remove water. See Figure 11 for the mechanism.

== History, etymology, and misuse ==
The term anti-periplanar was first coined by Klyne and Prelog in their work entitled "Description of steric relationships across single bonds", published in 1960. ‘Anti’ refers to the two functional groups lying on opposite sides of the plane of the bond. ‘Peri’ comes from the Greek word for ‘near’ and so periplanar means “approximately planar”. In their article “Periplanar or Coplanar?” Kane and Hersh point out that many organic textbooks use anti-periplanar to mean completely anti-planar, or anti-coplanar, which is technically incorrect.
