= Potassium ethoxide =

Names
- Preferred IUPAC name Potassium ethoxide
- Other names Potassium ethylate

Identifiers
CAS Number	917-58-8
3D model (JSmol)	Interactive image
Abbreviations	EtOK
ChemSpider	63375
ECHA InfoCard	100.011.845
EC Number	213-029-0
PubChem CID	23670592
CompTox Dashboard (EPA)	DTXSID10890530
- InChI: InChI=1S/C2H5O.K/c1-2-3;/h2H2,1H3;/q-1;+1 Key: RPDAUEIUDPHABB-UHFFFAOYSA-N; InChI=1/C2H5O.K/c1-2-3;/h2H2,1H3;/q-1;+1 Key: RPDAUEIUDPHABB-UHFFFAOYAN
- SMILES: CC[O-].[K+]

Properties
Chemical formula	C_{2}H_{5}KO
Molar mass	84.159 g·mol^{−1}
Appearance	Yellow or Off-White Powder
Density	0.894 g/mL
Melting point	250 °C (482 °F; 523 K)
Solubility in water	Reacts

Hazards
- GHS labelling
Pictograms	(GHS02: Flammable) (GHS05: Corrosive)
Signal word	Danger
Hazard statements	H251, H314
Precautionary statements	P235+P410, P260, P264, P280, P301+P330+P331, P303+P361+P353, P304+P340, P305+P351+P338, P310, P321, P363, P405, P407, P413, P420, P501
- Except where otherwise noted, data are given for materials in their standard state (at 25 °C [77 °F], 100 kPa). Infobox references

Potassium ethoxide, also known as potassium ethanolate, is an off-white or yellow powder with the chemical formula of C_{2}H_{5}KO. It contains an ethoxide ion, the conjugate base of ethanol, which makes these compounds strongly basic. It hydrolyzes to yield ethanol and potassium hydroxide.

== Uses ==
Potassium ethoxide is used as a strong base, similar to sodium and potassium methoxides, and potassium tert-butoxide. Catalytic amounts of potassium ethoxide in ethanol can be used to perform transesterification reactions that yield ethyl esters. Sodium or potassium ethoxide is also a suitable base for the malonic ester synthesis where diethyl malonate is used, since any transesterification reaction does not result in ester scrambling.

== Safety ==
Potassium ethoxide is stable, but also both flammable and corrosive. The compound reacts vigorously with water. If the compound comes into contact with damp air, it may lead to the heating and ignition of the solid powder. It must be kept separated from air, moisture, water, acids, oxidizing agents, and reducing agents. It can also cause severe skin burns.
