= Tert-Butyl chloride =

tert-Butyl chloride
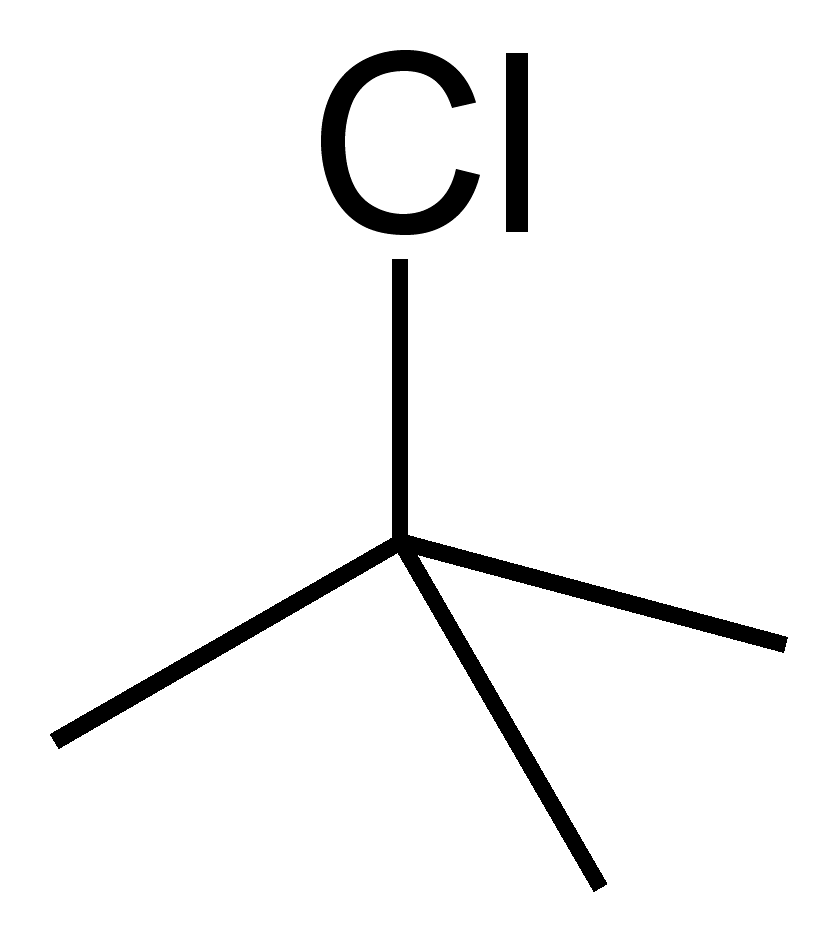

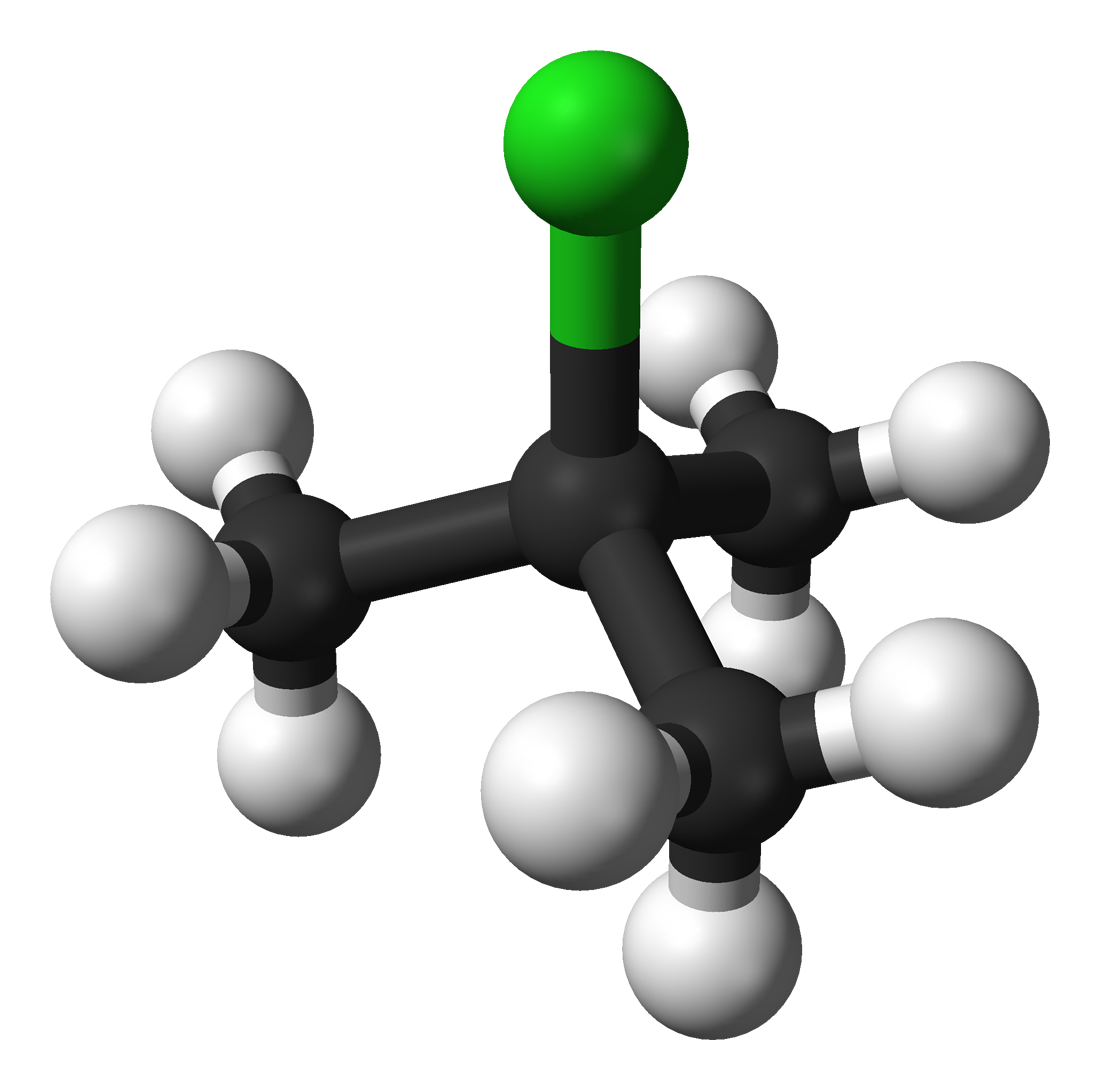

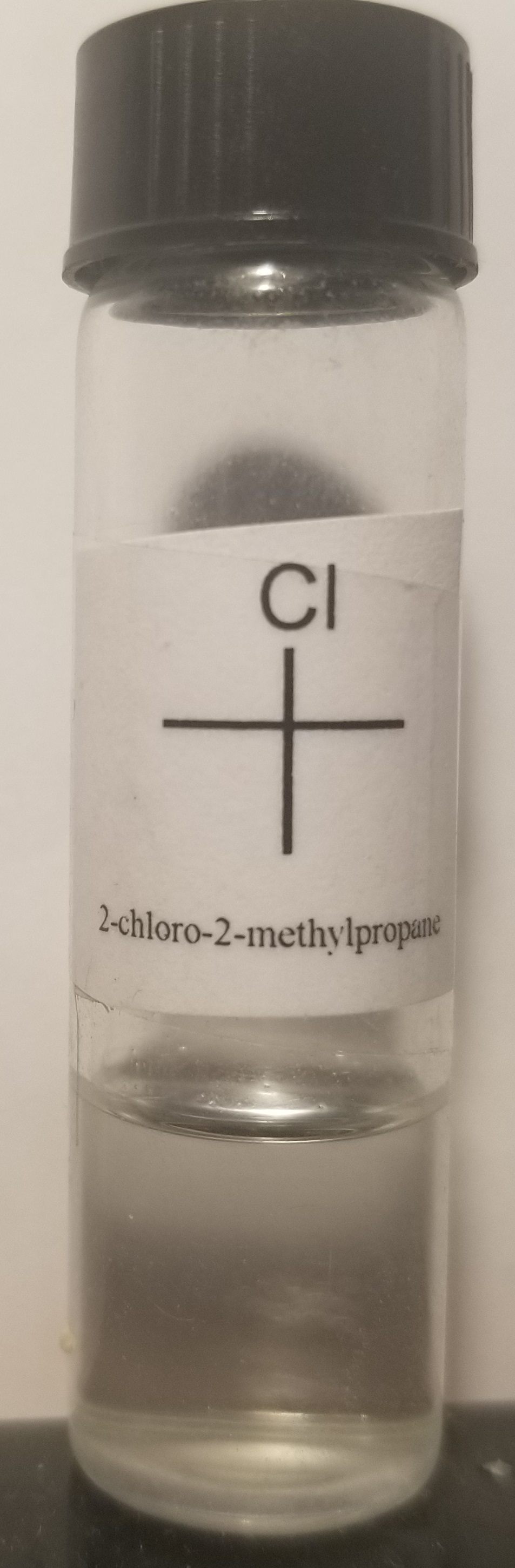

Names
- Preferred IUPAC name 2-Chloro-2-methylpropane
- Other names 1,1-dimethylethyl chloride 1-chloro-1,1-dimethylethane chlorotrimethylmethane trimethylchloromethane t-butyl chloride

Identifiers
CAS Number	507-20-0
3D model (JSmol)	Interactive image
Abbreviations	Me_{3}CCl t-BuCl tBuCl^{t}BuCl
ChEMBL	ChEMBL346997
ChemSpider	10054
ECHA InfoCard	100.007.334
EC Number	208-066-4
PubChem CID	10486
RTECS number	TX5040000
UNII	JN2YO95TZ0
UN number	1127
CompTox Dashboard (EPA)	DTXSID2023937
- InChI: InChI=1S/C4H9Cl/c1-4(2,3)5/h1-3H3 Key: NBRKLOOSMBRFMH-UHFFFAOYSA-N
- SMILES: ClC(C)(C)C

Properties
Chemical formula	C_{4}H_{9}Cl
Molar mass	92.57 g·mol^{−1}
Appearance	Colorless liquid
Density	0.851 g/ml
Melting point	−26 °C (−15 °F; 247 K)
Boiling point	51 °C (124 °F; 324 K)
Solubility in water	Sparingly soluble in water, miscible with alcohol and ether
Vapor pressure	34.9 kPa (20 °C)

Hazards
- GHS labelling
Pictograms	(GHS02: Flammable)
Signal word	Danger
Hazard statements	H225
Precautionary statements	P210, P233, P240, P241, P242, P243, P280, P303+P361+P353, P370+P378, P403+P235, P501
NFPA 704 (fire diamond)	2 3 0
Flash point	−9 °C (16 °F; 264 K) (open cup) −23 °C (closed cup)
Autoignition temperature	540 °C (1,004 °F; 813 K)

Related compounds
Related alkyl halides	tert-Butyl bromide
- Except where otherwise noted, data are given for materials in their standard state (at 25 °C [77 °F], 100 kPa). verify (what is ?) Infobox references

tert-Butyl chloride is the organochloride with the formula (CH_{3})_{3}CCl. It is a colorless, flammable liquid. It is sparingly soluble in water, with a tendency to undergo hydrolysis to the corresponding tert-butyl alcohol. It is produced industrially as a precursor to other organic compounds.

== Synthesis ==
tert-Butyl chloride is produced by the reaction of tert-butyl alcohol with hydrogen chloride. In the laboratory, concentrated hydrochloric acid is used. The conversion entails a S_{N}1 reaction as shown below.

Step 1	Step 2	Step 3
The acid protonates the alcohol, forming a good leaving group (water).	Water leaves the protonated t-BuOH, forming a relatively stable tertiary carbocation.	The chloride ion attacks the carbocation, forming t-BuCl.

The overall reaction, therefore, is:

(CH_{3})_{3}COH + HCl → (CH_{3})_{3}CCl + H_{2}O

Because tert-butanol is a tertiary alcohol, the relative stability of the tert-butyl carbocation in the step 2 allows the S_{N}1 mechanism to be followed, whereas a primary alcohol would follow an S_{N}2 mechanism.

== Reactions ==
When tert-butyl chloride is dissolved in water, it undergoes a hydrolysis to tert-butyl alcohol. When dissolved in alcohols, the corresponding t-butyl ethers are produced.

== Uses ==
tert-Butyl chloride is used to prepare the antioxidant tert-butylphenol and the fragrance base neohexyl chloride.

== See also ==
- Isobutane
