= Edward David Hughes =

Edward David Hughes FRS (June 18, 1906 – June 30, 1963) was a British organic chemist. He was a professor first at University College, Bangor and then at University College in London, eventually rising to the rank of dean at each. He was elected as a Fellow of the Royal Society in 1949.

Hughes was born on a farm near Llanystumdwy, Caernarfonshire, youngest son of the nine children of Huw and Ann Hughes. He attended the local primary school and then Porthmadog grammar school where he had a particularly good science teacher. He gained a place at University College, Bangor, to read chemistry. "During 1927-28, he was trained as a teacher, and the following year he returned to his old department as a research student. He took his Ph.D. degree in 1930 and was awarded the M.Sc. of London University in 1932 and D.Sc. (London) in 1936." That same year he was awarded the Meldola medal of the Chemical Society and also elected Ramsay Memorial Fellow. He delivered the Tilden Lecture of the Chemical Society in 1945.

Hughes studied organic reaction mechanisms and reaction kinetics, including being one of the first chemists to use isotopes to understand them. He collaborated with Christopher Kelk Ingold, leading to development of the eponymous Hughes–Ingold rules and Hughes–Ingold symbols. He wrote over 200 articles and scientific papers.

== Personal life ==
In 1934, in Willesden, Hughes married Rachel (Ray) Fortune Christina, daughter of Llewellyn Davies. They had one daughter, Carol Anthea, born in 1947. Edward died in University College Hospital, London, on 30 June 1963, after a short illness. Rachel died in a nursing home in Harrogate on 28 June 1967.
