= Walden inversion =

Chemical reaction mechanism

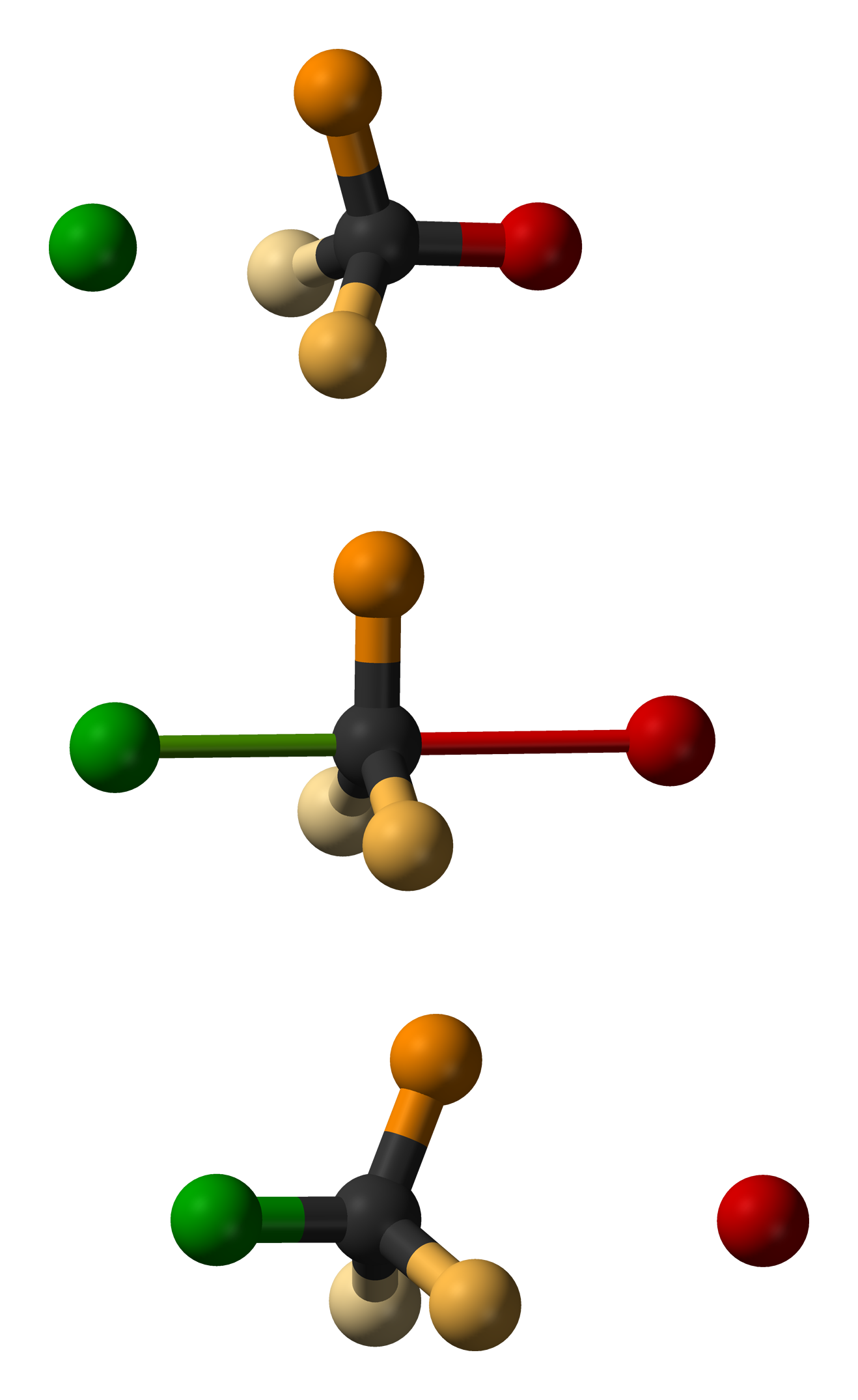
Montage, using ball-and-stick models, of the three steps in an S_{N}2 reaction. The nucleophile is green, the leaving group is red and the three substituents are orange.

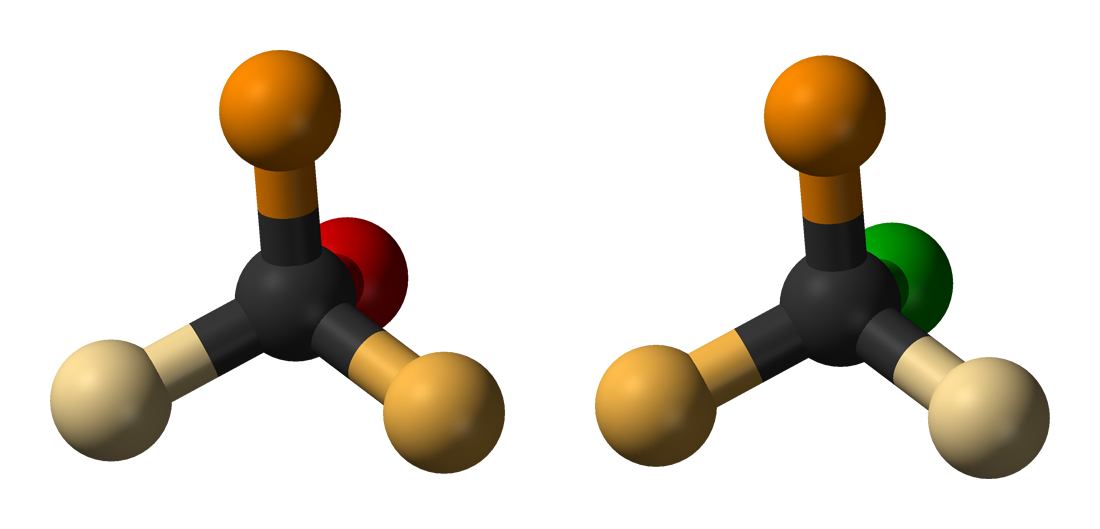
The S_{N}2 reaction causes inversion of stereochemical configuration, known as Walden inversion.

Walden inversion is the inversion of a stereogenic center in a chiral molecule in a chemical reaction. Since a molecule can form two enantiomers around a stereogenic center, the Walden inversion converts the configuration of the molecule from one enantiomeric form to the other. For example, in an S_{N}2 reaction, Walden inversion occurs at a tetrahedral carbon atom. It can be visualized by imagining an umbrella turned inside-out in a gale. In the Walden inversion, the backside attack by the nucleophile in an S_{N}2 reaction gives rise to a product whose configuration is opposite to the reactant. Therefore, during S_{N}2 reaction, 100% inversion of product takes place. This is known as Walden inversion.

It was first observed by chemist Paul Walden in 1896. He was able to convert one enantiomer of a chemical compound into the other enantiomer and back again in a so-called Walden cycle which went like this: (+)-chlorosuccinic acid (1 in the illustration) was converted to (+)-malic acid 2 by action of silver oxide in water with retention of configuration. In the next step the hydroxyl group was replaced by chlorine to the other isomer of chlorosuccinic acid 3 by reaction with phosphorus pentachloride. A reaction with silver oxide yielded (−)-malic acid 4 and finally a reaction with PCl_{5} returned the cycle to its starting point.

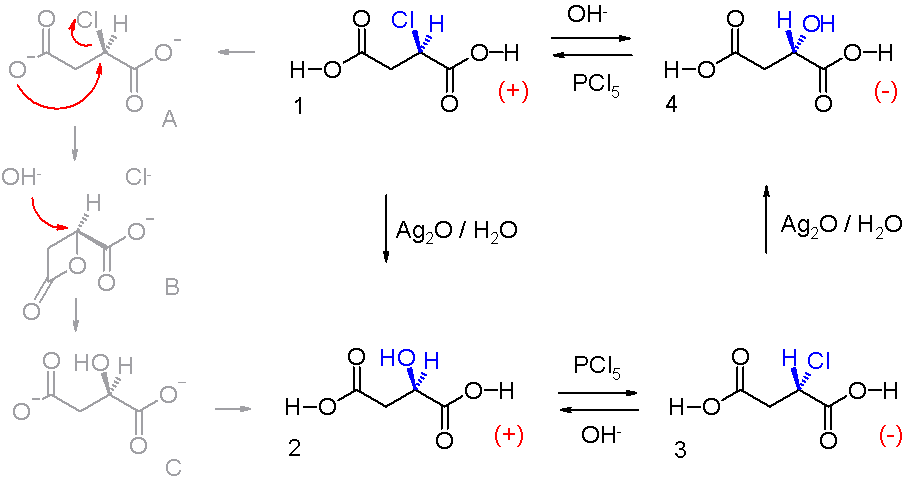

In this reaction, the silver oxide in the first step acts as a hydroxide donor while the silver ion plays no role in the reaction. The intermediates are the carboxyl dianion A which gives an intramolecular nucleophilic substitution by the β-carboxylate anion to produce a four-membered β-lactone ring B. The α-carboxyl group is also reactive but in silico data suggests that the transition state for the formation of the three-membered α-lactone is very high. A hydroxyde ion ring-opens the lactone to form the alcohol C and the net effect of two counts of inversion is retention of configuration.

== See also ==
- Another demonstration of the Walden cycle in the Brook rearrangement.
