= SN2 reaction =

Organic chemistry reaction

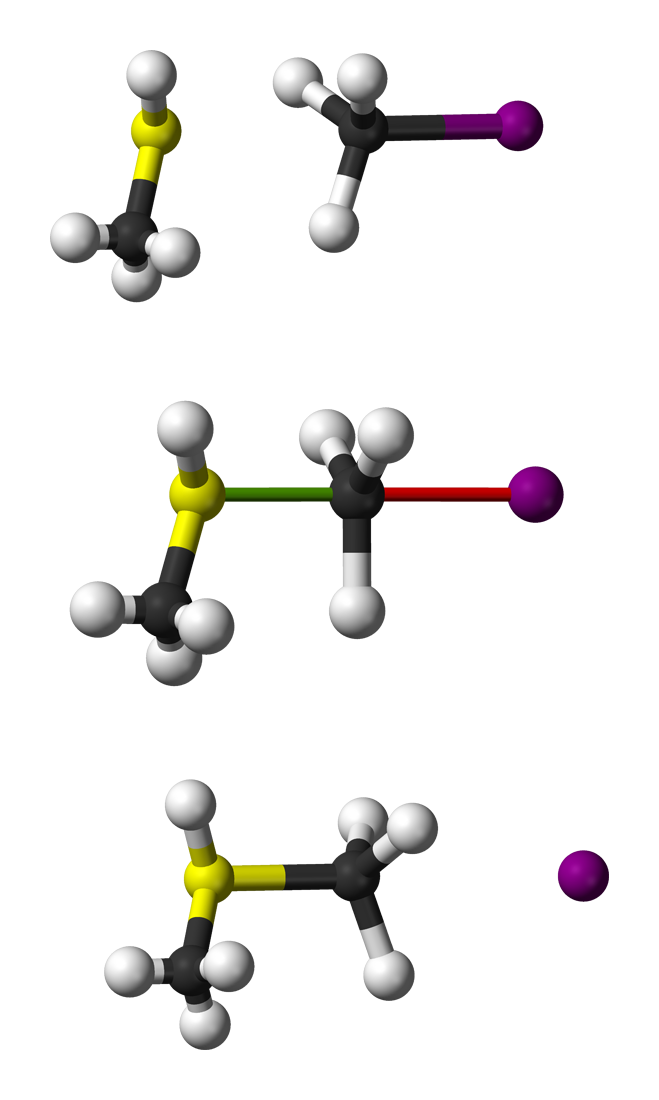
Ball-and-stick representation of the S_{N}2 reaction of CH_{3}SH with CH_{3}I yielding dimethylsulfonium. The attacking group attacks from the backside of the leaving group.

The bimolecular nucleophilic substitution (S_{N}2) is a type of reaction mechanism that is common in organic chemistry. In the S_{N}2 reaction, a strong nucleophile forms a new bond to an sp^{3}-hybridised carbon atom by way of a backside attack, all while the leaving group detaches from the reaction center in a concerted (simultaneous) fashion.

The name S_{N}2 refers to the Hughes-Ingold symbol of the mechanism: "S_{N}" indicates that the reaction is a nucleophilic substitution, and "2" that it proceeds through a bimolecular mechanism, which means both the reacting species are involved in the rate-determining step. What distinguishes S_{N}2 from the other major type of nucleophilic substitution, the S_{N}1 reaction, is that the displacement of the leaving group, which is the rate-determining step, is separate from the nucleophilic attack in S_{N}1.

The S_{N}2 reaction can be considered as an organic chemistry analogue of the associative substitution from the field of inorganic chemistry.

== Reaction mechanism ==
The reaction most often occurs at an aliphatic sp^{3} carbon center with an electronegative, stable leaving group attached to it, which is frequently a halogen (often denoted X). The formation of the C–Nu bond, due to attack by the nucleophile (denoted Nu), occurs together with the breakage of the C–X bond. The reaction occurs through a transition state in which the reaction center is pentacoordinate and approximately sp^{2}-hybridised.

The S_{N}2 reaction can be viewed as a HOMO–LUMO interaction between the nucleophile and substrate. The reaction occurs only when the occupied lone pair orbital of the nucleophile donates electrons to the unfilled σ* antibonding orbital between the central carbon and the leaving group. Throughout the course of the reaction, a p orbital forms at the reaction center as the result of the transition from the molecular orbitals of the reactants to those of the products.

To achieve optimal orbital overlap, the nucleophile attacks 180° relative to the leaving group, resulting in the leaving group being pushed off the opposite side and the product formed with inversion of tetrahedral geometry at the central atom.

For example, the synthesis of macrocidin A, a fungal metabolite, involves an intramolecular ring closing step through an S_{N}2 reaction with a phenoxide group as the nucleophile and a halide as the leaving group, forming an ether. Reactions such as this, with an alkoxide as the nucleophile, are known as the Williamson ether synthesis.

Synthesis of macrocidin A via S_{N}2 etherification.

If the substrate that is undergoing S_{N}2 reaction has a chiral centre, then inversion of configuration (stereochemistry and optical activity) may occur; this is called the Walden inversion. For example, 1-bromo-1-fluoroethane can undergo nucleophilic attack to form 1-fluoroethan-1-ol, with the nucleophile being an HO^{−} group. In this case, if the reactant is levorotatory, then the product would be dextrorotatory, and vice versa.

S_{N}2 mechanism of 1-bromo-1-fluoroethane with one of the carbon atoms being a chiral centre.

== Factors affecting the rate of the reaction ==
The four factors that affect the rate of the reaction, in the order of decreasing importance, are:

=== Substrate ===
The substrate plays the most important part in determining the rate of the reaction. For S_{N}2 reaction to occur more quickly, the nucleophile must easily access the sigma antibonding orbital between the central carbon and leaving group.

S_{N}2 occurs more quickly with substrates that are more sterically accessible at the central carbon; in other words, with substrates that do not have as much sterically hindering substituents nearby. Methyl and primary substrates react the fastest, followed by secondary substrates. Tertiary substrates do not react via the S_{N}2 pathway, as the greater steric hindrance between the nucleophile and nearby groups of the substrate will leave the S_{N}1 reaction to occur first.

Substrates with adjacent pi C=C systems can favor both S_{N}1 and S_{N}2 reactions. In S_{N}1, allylic and benzylic carbocations are stabilized by delocalizing the positive charge. In S_{N}2, however, the conjugation between the reaction centre and the adjacent pi system stabilizes the transition state. Because they destabilize the positive charge in the carbocation intermediate, electron-withdrawing groups favor the S_{N}2 reaction. Electron-donating groups favor leaving-group displacement and are more likely to react via the S_{N}1 pathway.

=== Nucleophile ===
Like the substrate, steric hindrance affects the nucleophile's strength. The methoxide anion, for example, is both a strong base and nucleophile because it is a methyl nucleophile, and is thus very much unhindered. tert-Butoxide, on the other hand, is a strong base, but a poor nucleophile, because of its three methyl groups hindering its approach to the carbon. Nucleophile strength is also affected by charge and electronegativity: nucleophilicity increases with increasing negative charge and decreasing electronegativity. For example, OH^{−} is a better nucleophile than water, and I^{−} is a better nucleophile than Br^{−} (in polar protic solvents). In a polar aprotic solvent, nucleophilicity increases up a column of the periodic table as there is no hydrogen bonding between the solvent and nucleophile; in this case nucleophilicity mirrors basicity. I^{−} would therefore be a weaker nucleophile than Br^{−} because it is a weaker base. Verdict - A strong/anionic nucleophile always favours S_{N}2 manner of nucleophillic substitution.

=== Leaving group ===
Good leaving groups on the substrate lead to faster S_{N}2 reactions. A good leaving group must be able to stabilize the electron density that comes from breaking its bond with the carbon center. This leaving group ability trend corresponds well to the pK_{a} of the leaving group's conjugate acid (pK_{aH}); the lower its pK_{aH} value, the faster the leaving group is displaced.

Leaving groups that are neutral, such as water, alcohols (R−OH), and amines (R−NH_{2}), are good examples because of their positive charge when bonded to the carbon center prior to nucleophilic attack. Halides (Cl^{−}, Br^{−}, and I^{−}, with the exception of F^{−}), serve as good anionic leaving groups because electronegativity stabilizes additional electron density; the fluoride exception is due to its strong bond to carbon.

Leaving group reactivity of alcohols can be increased with sulfonates, such as tosylate (^{−}OTs), triflate (^{−}OTf), and mesylate (^{−}OMs). Poor leaving groups include hydroxide (^{−}OH), alkoxides (^{−}OR), and amides (^{−}NR_{2}).

The Finkelstein reaction is one S_{N}2 reaction in which the leaving group can also act as a nucleophile. In this reaction, the substrate has a halogen atom exchanged with another halogen. As the negative charge is more-or-less stabilized on both halides, the reaction occurs at equilibrium.

=== Solvent ===
The solvent affects the rate of reaction because solvents may or may not surround a nucleophile, thus hindering or not hindering its approach to the carbon atom. Polar aprotic solvents, like tetrahydrofuran, are better solvents for this reaction than polar protic solvents because polar protic solvents will hydrogen bond to the nucleophile, hindering it from attacking the carbon with the leaving group. A polar aprotic solvent with low dielectric constant or a hindered dipole end will favour S_{N}2 manner of nucleophilic substitution reaction. Examples: dimethylsulfoxide, dimethylformamide, acetone, etc. In parallel, solvation also has a significant impact on the intrinsic strength of the nucleophile, in which strong interactions between solvent and the nucleophile, found for polar protic solvents, furnish a weaker nucleophile. In contrast, polar aprotic solvents can only weakly interact with the nucleophile, and thus, are to a lesser extent able to reduce the strength of the nucleophile.

== Reaction kinetics ==
The rate of an S_{N}2 reaction is second order, as the rate-determining step depends on the nucleophile concentration, [Nu^{−}], as well as the concentration of substrate, [RX].

r = k[RX][Nu^{−}]

This is a key difference between the S_{N}1 and S_{N}2 mechanisms. In the S_{N}1 reaction the nucleophile attacks after the rate-limiting step is over, whereas in S_{N}2 the nucleophile forces off the leaving group in the limiting step. In other words, the rate of S_{N}1 reactions depend only on the concentration of the substrate while the S_{N}2 reaction rate depends on the concentration of both the substrate and nucleophile.

It has been shown that except in uncommon (but predictable) cases, primary and secondary substrates go exclusively by the S_{N}2 mechanism, while tertiary substrates go by the S_{N}1 mechanism. There are two factors which complicate determining the mechanism of nucleophilic substitution reactions at secondary carbons:

1. Many reactions studied are solvolysis reactions where a solvent molecule (often an alcohol) is the nucleophile. While still a second order reaction mechanistically, the reaction is kinetically first order as the concentration of the nucleophile–the solvent molecule, is effectively constant during the reaction. This type of reaction is often called a pseudo first order reaction.
2. In reactions where the leaving group is also a good nucleophile (bromide for instance) the leaving group can perform an S_{N}2 reaction on a substrate molecule. If the substrate is chiral, this inverts the configuration of the substrate before solvolysis, leading to a racemized product–the product that would be expected from an S_{N}1 mechanism. In the case of a bromide leaving group in alcoholic solvent Cowdrey et al. have shown that bromide can have an S_{N}2 rate constant 100-250 times higher than the rate constant for ethanol. Thus, after only a few percent solvolysis of an enantiospecific substrate, it becomes racemic.

The examples in textbooks of secondary substrates going by the S_{N}1 mechanism invariably involve the use of bromide (or other good nucleophile) as the leaving group have confused the understanding of alkyl nucleophilic substitution reactions at secondary carbons. Work with the 2-adamantyl system (S_{N}2 not possible) by Schleyer and co-workers, the use of azide (an excellent nucleophile but very poor leaving group) by Weiner and Sneen, the development of sulfonate leaving groups (non-nucleophilic good leaving groups), and the demonstration of significant experimental problems in the initial claim of an S_{N}1 mechanism in the solvolysis of optically active 2-bromooctane by Hughes et al. have demonstrated conclusively that secondary substrates go exclusively (except in unusual but predictable cases) by the S_{N}2 mechanism.

== E2 competition ==
A common side reaction taking place with S_{N}2 reactions is E2 elimination: the incoming anion can act as a base rather than as a nucleophile, abstracting a proton and leading to formation of the alkene. This pathway is favored with sterically hindered nucleophiles. Elimination reactions are usually favoured at elevated temperatures because of increased entropy. This effect can be demonstrated in the gas-phase reaction between a phenolate and a simple alkyl bromide taking place inside a mass spectrometer:

Competition experiment between SN2 and E2

With ethyl bromide, the reaction product is predominantly the substitution product. As steric hindrance around the electrophilic center increases, as with isobutyl bromide, substitution is disfavored and elimination is the predominant reaction. Other factors favoring elimination are the strength of the base. With the less basic benzoate substrate, isopropyl bromide reacts with 55% substitution. In general, gas phase reactions and solution phase reactions of this type follow the same trends, even though in the first, solvent effects are eliminated.

== Roundabout mechanism ==
A development attracting attention in 2008 concerns a S_{N}2 roundabout mechanism observed in a gas-phase reaction between chloride ions and methyl iodide with a special technique called crossed molecular beam imaging. When the chloride ions have sufficient velocity, the initial collision of it with the methyl iodide molecule causes the methyl iodide to spin around once before the actual S_{N}2 displacement mechanism takes place.

== See also ==
- Arrow pushing
- Christopher Kelk Ingold
- Finkelstein reaction
- Neighbouring group participation
- Nucleophilic acyl substitution
- Nucleophilic aromatic substitution
- S_{N}1 reaction
- S_{N}i
- Substitution reaction
