= Protic solvent =

Solvent containing an H+ ion

In chemistry, a protic solvent is a solvent that has a hydrogen atom bound to an oxygen (as in a hydroxyl group −OH), a nitrogen (as in an amine group −NH_{2} or −NH−), or fluoride (as in hydrogen fluoride). In general terms, any solvent that contains a labile H^{+} is called a protic solvent. The molecules of such solvents readily donate protons (H^{+}) to solutes, often via hydrogen bonding. Water is the most common protic solvent. Conversely, polar aprotic solvents cannot donate protons but still have the ability to dissolve many salts.

Methods for purification of common solvents are available.

Solvent	Chemical formula	Boiling point	Dielectric constant	Density	Dipole moment (D)
Polar protic solvents
formic acid	HCO_{2}H	101 °C	58	1.21 g/mL	1.41 D
n-butanol	CH_{3}CH_{2}CH_{2}CH_{2}OH	118 °C	18	0.810 g/mL	1.63 D
isopropanol (IPA)	(CH_{3})_{2}CH(OH)	82 °C	18	0.785 g/mL	1.66 D
nitromethane (Note: Although the hydrogen is bonded to the carbon, the carbon is next to a positively charged nitrogen and it is double bonded to an oxygen)	CH_{3}NO_{2}	101°C	35.87	1.1371 g/mL	3.56 D
ethanol (EtOH)	CH_{3}CH_{2}OH	79 °C	24.55	0.789 g/mL	1.69 D
methanol (MeOH)	CH_{3}OH	65 °C	33	0.791 g/mL	1.70 D
Acetic acid (AcOH)	CH_{3}CO_{2}H	118 °C	6.2	1.049 g/mL	1.74 D
Water	H_{2}O	100 °C	80	1.000 g/mL	1.85 D

== See also ==
- Autoprotolysis
