= SN1 reaction =

Substitution reaction with a carbocation intermediate

General reaction scheme for the S_{N}1 reaction. The leaving group is denoted "X", and the nucleophile is denoted "Nu–H".

The unimolecular nucleophilic substitution (S_{N}1) reaction is a substitution reaction in organic chemistry. The Hughes-Ingold symbol of the mechanism expresses two properties—"S_{N}" stands for "nucleophilic substitution", and the "1" says that the rate-determining step is unimolecular. Thus, the rate equation is often shown as having first-order dependence on the substrate and zero-order dependence on the nucleophile. This relationship holds for situations where the amount of nucleophile is much greater than that of the intermediate. Instead, the rate equation may be more accurately described using steady-state kinetics. The reaction involves a carbocation intermediate and is commonly seen in reactions of secondary or tertiary alkyl halides under strongly basic conditions or, under strongly acidic conditions, with secondary or tertiary alcohols. With primary and secondary alkyl halides, the alternative S_{N}2 reaction occurs. In inorganic chemistry, the S_{N}1 reaction is often known as the dissociative substitution. This dissociation pathway is well-described by the cis effect. A reaction mechanism was first introduced by Christopher Ingold et al. in 1940. This reaction does not depend much on the strength of the nucleophile, unlike the S_{N}2 mechanism which involves a single step.

The first step of the S_{N}1 reaction is the ionization of alkyl halide in the presence of aqueous acetone or ethyl alcohol. This step provides a carbocation as an intermediate, which is planar. In later steps attack of nucleophile may occur from either side to give a racemic product, but actually complete racemization does not take place. This is because the nucleophilic species attacks the carbocation even before the departing halide's ion has moved sufficiently away from the carbocation. The negatively charged halide ion shields the carbocation from being attacked on the front side, and backside attack, which leads to inversion of configuration, is preferred. Thus the actual product no doubt consists of a mixture of enantiomers but the enantiomers with inverted configuration would predominate and complete racemization does not occur.

== Mechanism ==
An example of a reaction taking place with an S_{N}1 reaction mechanism is the hydrolysis of tert-butyl bromide forming tert-butanol:

This S_{N}1 reaction takes place in three steps:

- Formation of a tert-butyl carbocation by separation of a leaving group (a bromide anion) from the carbon atom: this step is slow.

Recombination of carbocation with nucleophile

- Nucleophilic attack: the carbocation reacts with the nucleophile. If the nucleophile is a neutral molecule (i.e. a solvent) a third step is required to complete the reaction. When the solvent is water, the intermediate is an oxonium ion. This reaction step is fast.

- Deprotonation: Removal of a proton on the protonated nucleophile by water acting as a base forming the alcohol and a hydronium ion. This reaction step is fast.

== Rate law ==
Although the rate law of the S_{N}1 reaction is often regarded as being first order in alkyl halide and zero order in nucleophile, this is a simplification that holds true only under certain conditions. While it, too, is an approximation, the rate law derived from the steady state approximation (SSA) provides more insight into the kinetic behavior of the S_{N}1 reaction. Consider the following reaction scheme for the mechanism shown above:

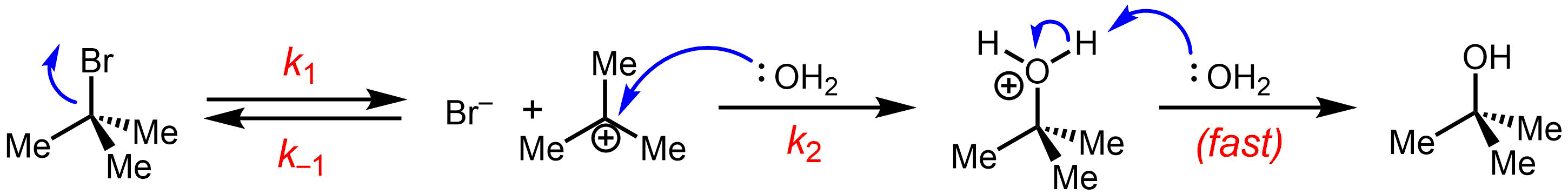

Though a relatively stable tertiary carbocation, tert-butyl cation is a high-energy species that is present only at very low concentration and cannot be directly observed under normal conditions. Thus, the SSA can be applied to this species:

(1) Steady state assumption: $\frac{d[\text{tBu}^+]}{dt} = 0 = k_1[\text{tBuBr}] - k_{-1}[\text{tBu}^+][\text{Br}^-] - k_2[\text{tBu}^+][\text{H}_2\text{O}]$

(2) Concentration of t-butyl cation, based on steady state assumption: $[\text{tBu}^+] = \frac{k_1[\text{tBuBr}]}{k_{-1}[\text{Br}^-] + k_2[\text{H}_2\text{O}]}$

(3) Overall reaction rate, assuming rapid final step: $\frac{d[\text{tBuOH}]}{dt} = k_2[\text{tBu}^+][\text{H}_2\text{O}]$

(4) Steady state rate law, by plugging (2) into (3): $\frac{d[\text{tBuOH}]}{dt} = \frac{k_1 k_2 [\text{tBuBr}][\text{H}_2\text{O}]}{k_{-1}[\text{Br}^-] + k_2[\text{H}_2\text{O}]}$

Under normal synthetic conditions, the entering nucleophile is more nucleophilic than the leaving group and is present in excess. Moreover, kinetic experiments are often conducted under initial rate conditions (5 to 10% conversion) and without the addition of bromide, so $[\text{Br}^-]$ is negligible. For these reasons, $k_{-1}[\text{Br}^-] \ll k_2[\text{H}_2\text{O}]$ often holds. Under these conditions, the SSA rate law reduces to:

$\text{rate} = \frac{d[\text{tBuOH}]}{dt} = \frac{k_1 k_2 [\text{tBuBr}][\text{H}_2\text{O}]}{k_2[\text{H}_2\text{O}]} = k_1[\text{tBuBr}]$

the simple first-order rate law described in introductory textbooks. Under these conditions, the concentration of the nucleophile does not affect the rate of the reaction, and changing the nucleophile (e.g. from H_{2}O to MeOH) does not affect the reaction rate, though the product is, of course, different. In this regime, the first step (ionization of the alkyl bromide) is slow, rate-determining, and irreversible, while the second step (nucleophilic addition) is fast and kinetically invisible.

However, under certain conditions, non-first-order reaction kinetics can be observed. In particular, when a large concentration of bromide is present while the concentration of water is limited, the reverse of the first step becomes important kinetically. As the SSA rate law indicates, under these conditions there is a fractional (between zeroth and first order) dependence on [H_{2}O], while there is a negative fractional order dependence on [Br^{–}]. Thus, S_{N}1 reactions are often observed to slow down when an exogenous source of the leaving group (in this case, bromide) is added to the reaction mixture. This is known as the common ion effect and the observation of this effect is evidence for an S_{N}1 mechanism (although the absence of a common ion effect does not rule it out).

== Scope ==
The S_{N}1 mechanism tends to dominate when the central carbon atom is surrounded by bulky groups because such groups sterically hinder the S_{N}2 reaction. Additionally, bulky substituents on the central carbon increase the rate of carbocation formation because of the relief of steric strain that occurs. The resultant carbocation is also stabilized by both inductive stabilization and hyperconjugation from attached alkyl groups. The Hammond–Leffler postulate suggests that this, too, will increase the rate of carbocation formation. The S_{N}1 mechanism therefore dominates in reactions at tertiary alkyl centers.

An example of a reaction proceeding in a S_{N}1 fashion is the synthesis of 2,5-dichloro-2,5-dimethylhexane from the corresponding diol with concentrated hydrochloric acid:

As the alpha and beta substitutions increase with respect to leaving groups, the reaction is diverted from S_{N}2 to S_{N}1.

== Stereochemistry ==
The carbocation intermediate formed in the reaction's rate determining step (RDS) is an sp^{2} hybridized carbon with trigonal planar molecular geometry. This allows two different ways for the nucleophilic attack, one on either side of the planar molecule. If neither approach is favored, then these two ways occur equally, yielding a racemic mixture of enantiomers if the reaction takes place at a stereocenter. This is illustrated below in the S_{N}1 reaction of (S)-3-chloro-3-methylhexane with an iodide ion, which yields a racemic mixture of 3-iodo-3-methylhexane:

A typical S_{N}1 reaction, showing how racemisation occurs

However, an excess of one stereoisomer can be observed, as the leaving group can remain in proximity to the carbocation intermediate for a short time and block nucleophilic attack. This stands in contrast to the S_{N}2 mechanism, which is a stereospecific mechanism where stereochemistry is always inverted as the nucleophile comes in from the rear side of the leaving group.

== Side reactions ==
Two common side reactions are elimination reactions and carbocation rearrangement. If the reaction is performed under warm or hot conditions (which favor an increase in entropy), E1 elimination is likely to predominate, leading to formation of an alkene. At lower temperatures, S_{N}1 and E1 reactions are competitive reactions and it becomes difficult to favor one over the other. Even if the reaction is performed cold, some alkene may be formed. If an attempt is made to perform an S_{N}1 reaction using a strongly basic nucleophile such as hydroxide or methoxide ion, the alkene will again be formed, this time via an E2 elimination. This will be especially true if the reaction is heated. Finally, if the carbocation intermediate can rearrange to a more stable carbocation, it will give a product derived from the more stable carbocation rather than the simple substitution product.

== Solvent effects ==
Since the S_{N}1 reaction involves formation of an unstable carbocation intermediate in the rate-determining step (RDS), anything that can facilitate this process will speed up the reaction. The normal solvents of choice are both polar (to stabilize ionic intermediates in general) and protic solvents (to solvate the leaving group in particular). Typical polar protic solvents include water and alcohols, which will also act as nucleophiles, and the process is known as solvolysis.

The Y scale correlates solvolysis reaction rates of any solvent (k) with that of a standard solvent (80% v/v ethanol/water) (k_{0}) through

$$\log { \left ( \frac{k}{k_0} \right ) } = mY \,$$

with m a reactant constant (m = 1 for tert-butyl chloride) and Y a solvent parameter. For example, 100% ethanol gives Y = −2.3, 50% ethanol in water Y = +1.65 and 15% concentration Y = +3.2.

== See also ==
- Arrow pushing
- Nucleophilic acyl substitution
- Neighbouring group participation
- S_{N}2 reaction
