= Luzhou Daxishi Community arson case =

2003 crime in Taiwan

Luzhou Daxishi Community Arson Case
- Location: Taipei County, Taiwan Buildings G and H, Daxishi Community Lane 114, Alley 422, Minzu Road, Luzhou City
- Date: 31 August 2003; 1:55 a.m. ((UTC+8))
- Deaths: 16

Luzhou Daxishi Community Arson Case, also known as the Daxishi Arson Case or the Daxishi Community Fire, was a fire that occurred in the early hours of 31 August 2003. The incident took place at the Daxishi Community in Luzhou City, Taipei County, Taiwan (now Luzhou District, New Taipei City). Buildings G and H caught fire, affecting more than 70 households and over 100 residents, resulting in 16 deaths and 68 injuries.The buildings were repaired by 7 September, and residents began returning to the community on 8 September.

The fire prompted several regulatory changes. Since 2005, residential buildings with more than eight floors have been required to have two emergency staircases, and local governments began marking no-parking red lines in narrow alleys to ensure unobstructed access for fire engines.

== Background ==
The Daxishi Community was a residential complex in Luzhou City, Taipei County, Taiwan. It was a typical Taiwanese apartment complex with elevators built in the early 1990s.

In August 1993, before the government implemented floor area ratio controls, Furen Construction Company obtained a building permit and constructed the Daxishi Community on the southern bank of the Shuinangou area in Luzhou. As the southwestern corner of the site adjoined a planned but undeveloped road of greater width, the NewTaipei County Government approved the construction of eight above-ground floors. The complex was completed and opened in November 1995.The reinforced concrete complex consisted of eight buildings grouped into four blocks, designated A, B, and C through J, with a total of 250 residential units. The community lacked sufficient parking spaces.

Following the transfer of management by Furen Construction, disputes arose with residents, and the homeowner association faced financial difficulties. No residents were willing to serve on the committee, and public facilities were left without proper maintenance.

To satisfy residents' parking needs, the ground-floor hall shared by Buildings G and H was converted into a passageway. Residents habitually parked scooters inside this converted passage, greatly increasing the fire load at the only entrance and exit of the two buildings. The fire occurred in the connected Buildings G and H on the northwestern side of the community. Building G had one parallel double-flight staircase and one elevator, while Building H had one scissor staircase and two elevators.

In June 2003, the married couple Chiu Chun-sheng and Hsu Jui-chin moved into the Daxishi Community. Hsu had previously attempted suicide by leaking gas at their former residence in 2002 but failed. In late August 2003, Chiu and Hsu became involved in another heated argument, during which Hsu ignited lacquer thinner and set herself on fire, causing the blaze.

== Course of the Fire ==
=== Outbreak of the Fire ===
On the evening of 30 August 2003, Chiu Chun-sheng and his wife Hsu Jui-chin, residents of the first floor of Building G in the Daxishi Community, went out with friends for drinks and dinner at a food stall and later visited a karaoke establishment before returning home late at night. In the early hours of 31 August 2003, the couple became involved in a heated argument after drinking. At 1:52 a.m., Hsu Jui-chin attempted suicide by setting lacquer thinner on fire. Chiu Chun-sheng stopped her and took away the pine oil, placing it outside the apartment. At 1:55 a.m., while Chiu was not paying attention, Hsu went outside alone, poured a large quantity of pine oil over herself, and ignited it with a lighter.

=== Escalation into a Vehicle Fire and Building Fire ===
As a large amount of pine oil spread across the central courtyard of the Daxishi Community, the flames followed the flow of the oil and quickly ignited 64 scooters parked in the passageway, causing a vehicle fire. The fuel contained in the scooters' fuel tanks was described as equivalent to igniting an oil reservoir, causing the fire to grow rapidly.The flame plume suddenly rose and spread upward along the exterior walls beside the passageway between Buildings G and H, igniting combustible materials on the exterior walls. The flames entered apartments above the second floor through window ledges, resulting in a structure fire. The fire also blocked the shared exit of Buildings G and H. High-temperature smoke generated by the burning scooters filled the stairwells and rose upward. Within minutes, the smoke cut off escape routes above the second floor and entered apartments whose doors lacked fire protection or had been left open.

=== Emergency Calls and Rescue Operations ===
At around 1:50 a.m., neighbors living upstairs were disturbed by the intense sounds of the couple arguing and called 110 to report the disturbance. It was only after the fire broke out that someone called 119 to report the blaze. Fire crews from the Luzhou, Chenggong, and Cifu divisions of the Taipei County Fire Department arrived at 2:01 a.m., 2:02 a.m., and 2:06 a.m., respectively. By then, the flame plume had already reached the eighth-floor window ledges. Firefighters immediately requested reinforcements. Shortly afterward, Yen Chen-chia, director of the Taipei County Fire Department, arrived on the scene and took command of rescue operations, while the Taipei County Health Bureau established an emergency medical station beside the forward command post.

Because the narrow alleys restricted the operation of ladder trucks, firefighters used extension ladders and hook ladders from all sides of the building to climb upward and rescue trapped residents below the third floor.[9]:39 A civilian also raised a nearby crane, allowing rescuers to use the basket to reach the rooftop of an adjacent sheet-metal structure west of Building H, from where more than twenty people were evacuated.After approximately 40 minutes of burning, the fire on the first through fourth floors gradually came under control at 2:30 a.m. The blaze briefly spread to nearby buildings, but by 2:45 a.m. it was brought under control again. Around 3:00 a.m., some residents trapped on higher floors used descent devices belonging to neighbors to lower themselves by rope in an attempt to survive, with several falling to the ground and suffering serious injuries.At 3:30 a.m., Taipei County Magistrate Su Tseng-chang personally arrived from his official residence in Banqiao to direct operations. The fire was declared completely extinguished at 4:06 a.m. Three apartments were completely destroyed and fourteen were partially damaged.

At least 120 residents were inside Buildings G and H that night. Emergency operators instructed callers to "get out immediately" and "evacuate to the rooftop." Most households survived by staying inside with their doors closed and waiting for rescue. A small number attempted to escape through stairwells filled with smoke and were rendered unconscious or killed after inhaling smoke. Others became casualties after flames and smoke entered their apartments through doors and windows. In total, 112 people were rescued. Thirteen people died at the scene, 20 suffered serious injuries, and 51 sustained minor injuries. Three of those rescued later died in hospital several days afterward.

A total of 285 personnel, including police officers, firefighters， substitute military servicemen, and civilian volunteers, as well as 55 fire vehicles, were deployed.

== Aftermath ==
=== Relief Efforts and Restoration of the Damaged Buildings ===
The fire left more than one hundred people homeless. Following the disaster, the Taipei County Government and charitable organizations arranged relief and assistance for the affected households. County Magistrate Su Tseng-chang sought to repair the buildings as quickly as possible so that residents could return home before the Mid-Autumn Festival. On 31 August, Typhoon Dujuan passed through the Bashi Channel south of Taiwan, bringing wind and rain to the disaster area. The Taipei County Health Bureau established a shelter at the Chinghai Temple Activity Center and later relocated affected residents to the Hoti Motel. Samsung Engineering and Shuangxi Construction assisted in repairing the damaged buildings. On 7 September, the Taipei County Government completed the restoration of electricity, water supply, and building structures, and reinstalled fire escape facilities. A purification and blessing ceremony for residents returning to their homes was held on 8 September. Under the guidance of the Taipei County Government, the community established a homeowners association and resolved long-standing parking issues. Sanyang Motor donated 62 scooters to affected households.

== Impact ==
=== Accountability ===
Because the arsonist, Hsu Jui-chin, died from her injuries several days later, criminal liability could not be pursued against her. The affected residents instead sought compensation from her husband, Chiu Chun-sheng. In the criminal proceedings, Chiu was sentenced to one year and ten months in prison for negligent homicide in the first instance, which was increased to two years on appeal. In the civil proceedings, the Association for Victims Supportactively assisted victims in seeking compensation from Chiu, although both Chiu and his children renounced their inheritance rights to Hsu's estate. The Control Yuan issued corrective measures against the Ministry of the Interior（Taiwan）and the Taipei County Government.

In February 2014, Chiu Chun-sheng was stopped by police for drunk driving and was convicted of public endangerment by the Taiwan New Taipei District Court, receiving a sentence of three months' imprisonment, which could be commuted to a fine.

=== Influence of Popular Culture and Copycat Crimes ===
The case prompted reflection within Taiwanese society regarding self-immolation arson cases. Politicians, medical professionals, religious groups, and fire authorities discussed the relationship between popular television culture and the rise in arson incidents. Before the Daxishi Community fire, the highly rated SET Taiwan Taiwanese prime-time dramas Fiery Thunderbolthad aired from June 2002 to July 2003 and had recently reached its climax and finale. The antagonist Liu Wen-tsung frequently threatened others with the phrase "I'll send you a can of gasoline and a match," which became a popular catchphrase. Arson as a means of revenge was repeatedly portrayed in the series and was criticized for setting a negative example for viewers.Shortly after the program aired, the number of arson cases in Taiwan increased significantly. The Daxishi Community fire, together with the subsequent Taichung Dali Jiankang Public Housing fire and Qingshui arson case, were regarded as among the most notable examples of the increase in arson cases following the broadcast of Fiery Thunderbolt.

In February 2014, an arson attack on scooters parked under arcades and along sidewalks on Chenggong Road in Yonghe District, New Taipei City, ignited 53 scooters and spread to seven apartment buildings, resulting in one death. Firefighters regarded the incident as a repeat of the Daxishi Community fire.

=== Establishment of Fire Lanes in Narrow Alleys ===
The narrow alleyways surrounding the site of the Daxishi Community fire made rescue operations by large equipment and fire engines difficult. The Control Yuan issued corrective measures against the Ministry of the Interior and the Taipei County Government for failing to properly plan and maintain unobstructed emergency access routes. In late September, the Taipei County Government launched the "Alley Clearance Project" and purchased small fire engines. In December of the same year, the Ministry of the Interior issued guidelines regarding the management of rescue spaces and instructed subordinate agencies to implement them. Since then, local governments across Taiwan have strengthened restrictions on parking in narrow alleys in order to keep fire lanes clear.

=== Revision of the Building Technical Regulations ===
The Daxishi Community fire exposed deficiencies in fire safety measures for mid- and high-rise residential buildings. In 2005, the Construction and Planning Agency of the Ministry of the Interior amended the Building Technical Regulations, requiring residential buildings with eight or more floors to be equipped with two emergency staircases. Enhanced requirements for evacuation and firefighting facilities indirectly increased the proportion of common areas in residential buildings.
