= Solubility parameter =

Solubility parameter may refer to parameters of solubility:

- Hildebrand solubility parameter, a numerical estimate of the degree of interaction between materials, and can be a good indication of solubility
- Hansen solubility parameters, developed by Charles Hansen as a way of predicting if one material will dissolve in another and form a solution
