= List of Canadian military occupations =

The Canadian Armed Forces currently lists 109 military occupations that are performed by either officer or non-commissioned members. Many occupations, such as Training and Development Officer, are common across all three branches, while others, such as Sonar Operator, are specific to one element.

== Occupations ==
=== Current ===
==== Officer Occupations ====
The following is a list of the current 46 officer occupations across all three branches ("elements") of the Canadian military:

Occupation name	Element(s) Served		
Occupation name	Army	Navy	Air Force
Aerospace Control Officer			Checked
Aerospace Engineering Officer			Checked
Air Combat Systems Officer			Checked
Air Operations Officer			Checked
Anesthesiologist	Checked	Checked	Checked
Armour Officer	Checked		
Artillery Officer	Checked		
Bioscience Officer*	Checked	Checked	Checked
Cadet Instructor Cadre Officer†	Checked	Checked	Checked
Chaplain	Checked	Checked	Checked
Communications and Electronics Engineering Officer			Checked
Construction Engineering Officer			Checked
Critical Care Nursing Officer	Checked	Checked	Checked
Dental Officer	Checked		
Electrical and Mechanical Engineering Officer	Checked		
Emergency Medicine Specialist (Medical Specialist)	Checked	Checked	Checked
Engineer Officer	Checked		
General Surgeon (Medical Specialist)	Checked	Checked	Checked
Health Services Management Officer	Checked	Checked	Checked
Infantry Officer	Checked		
Intelligence Officer	Checked	Checked	Checked
Internal Medicine Specialist (Medical Specialist)	Checked	Checked	Checked
Legal Officer	Checked	Checked	Checked
Logistics Officer	Checked	Checked	Checked
Marine Systems Engineering Officer*		Checked	
Medical Officer	Checked	Checked	Checked
Medical Officer (CCFP(EM))	Checked	Checked	Checked
Mental Health Nursing Officer	Checked	Checked	Checked
Military Police Officer	Checked	Checked	Checked
Naval Combat Systems Engineering Officer*		Checked	
Naval Warfare Officer		Checked	
Nurse Practitioner†	Checked	Checked	Checked
Nursing Officer	Checked	Checked	Checked
Operating Room Nursing Officer	Checked	Checked	Checked
Personnel Selection Officer	Checked	Checked	Checked
Pharmacy Officer	Checked	Checked	Checked
Physical Medicine and Rehabilitation (Medical Specialist)*	Checked	Checked	Checked
Physician's Assistant	Checked	Checked	Checked
Physiotherapy Officer	Checked	Checked	Checked
Pilot			Checked
Psychiatrist (Medical Specialist)*	Checked	Checked	Checked
Public Affairs Officer	Checked	Checked	Checked
Radiologist (Medical Specialist)	Checked	Checked	Checked
Signals Officer	Checked		
Social work Officer	Checked	Checked	Checked
Training Development Officer	Checked	Checked	Checked

NOTES:
* indicates the occupation is available only in the Regular Force
† indicates the occupation is available only in the Reserve Force

==== NCM Occupations ====
The following is a list of the current 63 NCM (non-commissioned member) occupations across all three branches ("elements") of the Canadian military:

Occupation name	Element(s) Served		
Occupation name	Army	Navy	Air Force
Aerospace Control Operator			Checked
Aerospace Telecommunication and Information Systems Technician			Checked
Air Drop Systems Technician*	Checked		
Air Operations Support Technician			Checked
Air Weapons Systems Technician			Checked
Airborne Electronic Sensor Operator			Checked
Aircraft Structures Technician			Checked
Ammunition Technician*	Checked		
Armour Soldier	Checked		
Aviation Systems Technician			Checked
Avionics Systems Technician			Checked
Biomedical Electronics Technologist	Checked	Checked	Checked
Boatswain		Checked	
Combat Engineer	Checked		
Combat medic	Checked		
Construction Technician			Checked
Cook	Checked	Checked	Checked
Cyber Operator	Checked	Checked	Checked
Dental Technician	Checked		
Drafting and Survey Technician			Checked
Electrical Distribution Technician			Checked
Electrical Generation Systems Technician			Checked
Electronic-Optronic Technician – Land*	Checked		
Financial Services Administrator	Checked	Checked	Checked
Fire fighter*			Checked
Geomatics Technician*	Checked		
Gunner	Checked		
Human Resources Administrator	Checked	Checked	Checked
Imagery Technician	Checked	Checked	Checked
Infanteer	Checked		
Information Systems Technician	Checked		
Intelligence Operator	Checked	Checked	Checked
Line Technician	Checked		
Marine Technician		Checked	
Material Management Technician	Checked	Checked	Checked
Materials Technician*	Checked		
Medical Laboratory Technologist*	Checked	Checked	Checked
Medical Radiation Technologist	Checked	Checked	Checked
Meteorological Technician*	Checked	Checked	Checked
Military police	Checked	Checked	Checked
Mobile Support Equipment Operator	Checked		Checked
Musician	Checked	Checked	Checked
Naval Combat Information Operator		Checked	
Naval Communicator		Checked	
Naval Electronic Sensor Operator*		Checked	
Operating Room Technician*	Checked	Checked	Checked
Paramedic	Checked	Checked	Checked
Pipes and Drums†	Checked		Checked
Plumbing and Heating Technician			Checked
Port Inspection Diver†		Checked	
Postal Clerk	Checked		
Refrigeration and Mechanical Systems Technician			Checked
Search and Rescue Technician*‡			Checked
Signal Operator	Checked		
Signal Technician	Checked		
Signal Intelligence Specialist	Checked	Checked	Checked
Sonar Operator*		Checked	
Traffic Technician	Checked		Checked
Vehicle Technician	Checked		
Water, Fuels and Environmental technician			Checked
Weapons Engineering Technician*		Checked	
Weapons Technician – Land	Checked		

NOTES:
* indicates the occupation is available only in the Regular Force
† indicates the occupation is available only in the Reserve Force
‡ indicates entry to the trade only by occupational transfer; no direct entry

=== Former ===
The following list contains former occupations that have either been renamed, amalgamated or removed altogether:

Occupation name	Element(s) Served			Notes
Occupation name	Army	Navy	Air Force	Notes
Artillery Soldier	Checked			Renamed to Gunner
Electrical Technician		Checked		Amalgamated into Marine Technician trade
Communication Research Operator	Checked	Checked	Checked	Renamed to Signals Intelligence Specialist
Health Care Administration Officer	Checked	Checked	Checked	Renamed to Health Services Management Officer
Hull Technician		Checked		Amalgamated into Marine Technician trade
Marine Engineer		Checked		Amalgamated into Marine Technician trade
Medical Assistant	Checked	Checked	Checked	Renamed/reorganized (along with the Medical Technician trade) to the Combat Medic and Paramedic trades
Medical Technician	Checked	Checked	Checked	Renamed/reorganized (along with the Medical Assistant trade) to the Combat Medic and Paramedic trades
Naval Electronics Technician		Checked		Amalgamated into Weapons Engineering Technician Trade
Naval Weapons Technician		Checked		Amalgamated into Weapons Engineering Technician Trade
Resource Management Support Clerk	Checked	Checked	Checked	Split into two trades - Financial Services Administrator and Human Resource Administrator
Steward		Checked		Removed, some roles absorbed into Cook trade
Supply Technician	Checked	Checked	Checked	Renamed to Material Management Technician
