= Polar aprotic solvent =

Polar solvent with a low tendency to donate hydrogen ions

A polar aprotic solvent is a solvent that lacks an acidic proton and is polar. Such solvents lack hydroxyl and amine groups. In contrast to protic solvents, these solvents do not serve as proton donors in hydrogen bonding, although they can be proton acceptors. Many solvents, including chlorocarbons and hydrocarbons, are classifiable as aprotic, but polar aprotic solvents are of particular interest for their ability to dissolve salts. Methods for purification of common solvents are available.

Solvent	Chemical formula	Boiling point	Dielectric constant	Density	Dipole moment (D)	Comment
Polar aprotic solvents
acetone	(CH_{3})_{2}CO	56.1 °C	21.8	0.785 g/cm^{3}	2.91	reacts with strong acids and bases, somewhat protic due to keto-enol equilibrium and the unavoidable presence of water due to aldol condensation
acetonitrile	CH_{3}CN	82 °C	38.3	0.776 g/cm^{3}	3.20	reacts with strong acids and bases
dichloromethane	CH_{2}Cl_{2}	39.6 °C	9.08	1.327 g/cm^{3}	1.6	low boiling point
dimethylacetamide	(CH_{3})_{2}NCOCH_{3}	165 °C	37.8	0.94 g/cm^{3}	3.72	reacts with strong acids and bases
dimethylformamide	(CH_{3})_{2}NCHO	153 °C	36.7	0.95 g/cm^{3}	3.86	reacts with strong acids and bases
N-methylpyrrolidone	CH_{3}NCOC_{3}H_{6}	203 °C	32.3	1.028 g/cm^{3}	4.09	high boiling point
dimethylimidazolidone	(CH_{3}N)_{2}COC_{2}H_{4}	225 °C	37.6	1.056 g/cm^{3}	4.09	high boiling point
dimethylpropyleneurea	(CH_{3}N)_{2}COC_{3}H_{6}	246.5 °C	36.1	1.064 g/cm^{3}	4.23	high boiling point
dimethyl sulfoxide	(CH_{3})_{2}SO	189 °C	46.7	1.10 g/cm^{3}	3.96	reacts with strong bases, difficult to purify
ethyl acetate	C_{2}H_{5}OCOCH_{3}	77.1°C	6.02	0.902 g/cm^{3}	1.88	reacts with strong bases
hexamethylphosphoramide	[(CH_{3})_{2}N]_{3}PO	232.5 °C	29.6	1.03 g/cm^{3}	5.38	high boiling point, high toxicity
propylene carbonate	CH_{3}C_{2}H_{3}O_{2}CO	242 °C	64.9	1.205 g/cm^{3}	4.94	high boiling point
pyridine	C_{5}H_{5}N	115 °C	13.3	0.982 g/cm^{3}	2.22	reacts with protic and Lewis acids
sulfolane	C_{4}H_{8}SO_{2}	286 °C	43.3	1.27 g/cm^{3}	4.8	high boiling point
tetrahydrofuran	C_{4}H_{8}O	66 °C	7.6	0.887 g/cm^{3}	1.75	polymerizes in presence of strong protic and Lewis acids
