= Joel Henry Hildebrand =

American chemist (1881–1983)

- Born: November 16, 1881; Camden, New Jersey
- Died: April 30, 1983 (aged 101); Kensington, California
- Education: University of Pennsylvania
- Known for: nonelectrolyte solutions.
- Awards: William H. Nichols Medal (1939); George C. Pimentel Award in Chemical Education (1952); Willard Gibbs Award (1953); Priestley Medal (1962)
- Scientific career
- Fields: Chemistry
- Workplaces: University of California, Berkeley

Joel Henry Hildebrand (November 16, 1881 – April 30, 1983) was an American educator and a pioneer chemist. He was a major figure in physical chemistry research specializing in liquids and nonelectrolyte solutions.

== Education and professorship ==
He was born in Camden, New Jersey on November 16, 1881.

Hildebrand graduated from the University of Pennsylvania in 1903. He served briefly in the faculty before going to the University of California, Berkeley as a chemistry instructor in 1913. Within five years he became an assistant professor. In 1918 he was elevated to associate professor before finally being granted full professorship in 1919. On August 4, 1919, he was shot and wounded by a chemistry assistant angry at not being recommended for further advancement.

He was the dean of the College of Chemistry from 1949 through 1951 and retired from full-time teaching in 1952. Hildebrand Hall on the Berkeley campus is named for him.

== Accomplishments, discoveries, honors ==
His 1924 monograph on the solubility of non-electrolytes, Solubility, was the classic reference for almost half a century. In 1927, Hildebrand coined the term "regular solution" (to be contrasted with "ideal solution") and discussed their thermodynamic aspects in 1929. A regular solution is one involving no entropy change when a small amount of one of its components is transferred to it from an ideal solution of the same composition, the total volume remaining unchanged. Hildebrand's many scientific papers and chemistry texts include An Introduction to Molecular Kinetic Theory (1963) and Viscosity and Diffusivity (1977). He received the Distinguished Service Medal in 1918 and the King's Medal (British) in 1948.

Hildebrand served on the council of the National Academy of Sciences, of which he was a member, and was also a member of the Citizens Advisory Committee on Education to the California Legislature. He was elected to the American Philosophical Society in 1951. Hildebrand made several discoveries of which the most notable was the introduction in the mid-1920s of helium and oxygen breathing mixtures to replace air for divers to alleviate the condition known as the bends. He realized that the problem was caused by nitrogen gas dissolved in blood at high pressure, which was expelled too rapidly on return to the surface. Helium does not cause the same problem due to its much lower solubility in aqueous solutions such as blood. This discovery was later used to save the lives of 33 members of the submarine USS Squalus which went down in 1939.

Hildebrand won virtually every major prize in the field of chemistry except the Nobel Prize. The American Chemical Society created the Joel Henry Hildebrand Award in his honor for work pertaining to the field of theoretical and experimental chemistry of liquids. The first award was presented to Hildebrand himself in 1981 as part of the observances of his 100th birthday. He has been identified by Kantha in 2001, as one of the 35 centenarian scientists who belonged to an unusual cluster that was newly formed in the 20th century.

Hildebrand often said he most cherished his role as a teacher. In an interview conducted shortly before his 100th birthday, he observed: "Good teaching is primarily an art, and can neither be defined or standardized ... Good teachers are born and made; neither part of the process can be omitted." He remained committed to working with undergraduate students even at the age of 100. He came to his office on campus nearly every school day until declining health made it impossible.

Hildebrand was also active in the Sierra Club, and was its president from 1937 through 1940. As a member he contributed to many important land-use reports about State and National Parks in California. He also managed the 1936 US Olympic Ski Team.

== Scientific contributions ==
His study of the solubility of non-electrolytes led to his formation of the "Hildebrand solubility parameter"

$$\delta = \sqrt{(\Delta H_v - RT) / V_m}.$$

The general idea is that a potential solute will be soluble in a solvent with a comparable value for $\delta$.

This work was then used in the formation of the more comprehensive "Hansen solubility parameter", which accounts not just for dispersion interactions between solvent and solute (as the Hildebrand parameter does), but also for hydrogen bonding and polar interactions – thus lifting the restriction of application to just non-polar species. Hansen shows great respect for Hildebrand and his work and indeed acknowledges that his work of the Hansen solubility parameter would not have been possible without the great contribution that Hildebrand made to this field.

Hildebrand was also outspoken on the manner in which small non-polar species exist in water. The dissolution of species such as methane in water is accompanied by both a negative enthalpy and a negative entropy. A common model for this behavior is the iceberg- or clathrate-type model, in which a network or cage of hydrogen-bonded water develops around the methane molecule. This explains the drop in enthalpy, since hydrogen bonding is increased compared to pure water, and the drop in entropy, since a solvent excluded volume has come into existence along with an ordered network of water molecules.

Hildebrand challenged this popular view in a series of papers in the late 1960s and 1970s and concluded that methane has a just a 40% lower diffusivity in water than in carbon tetrachloride. If water was enclatherated or in an iceberg-type structure, then he predicted that this diffusivity difference between water and carbon tetrachloride ought to be significantly larger.

This conflict of ideas still exists in the literature with publications between 2000 and 2010 for the clathrate-type hydrophobic hydration still being submitted in computer simulations of various types. There are papers, however, which cite Hildebrand's earlier criticisms of this model and suggest that hydrophobicity arises from the small size of water increasing the free energy required to develop a suitable cavity for certain solutes to occupy.

With George Scatchard, Hildebrand developed an equation for excess molar volumes in mixtures.
