= Charles M. Hansen =

American-Danish chemical engineer

Charles Medom Hansen (born 1938 in Louisville, Kentucky) is an American-born scientist with Danish ancestry who is now a Danish citizen living in the Copenhagen area.

== Education and research ==
After a degree (1961, Louisville) and Masters (1962, Wisconsin) in chemical engineering, Hansen worked for his Ph.D. at the Technical University of Denmark, initially on the problems of solvent retention in polymers, starting his lifetime interest in diffusion science. However, the problems of predicting the compatibility of solvents with polymers took over, leading him to overcome the problems of the Hildebrand solubility parameter by dividing Hildebrand's single parameter into three components: dispersion, polar and hydrogen bonding. His 1967 doctoral thesis (Dr. techn.) provided the basis for what came to be called Hansen solubility parameters, or HSPs. In addition to providing a theoretical framework, the thesis provided the first working set of HSP values for common solvents and for a range of commercial polymers, making it of immediate practical use to academia and industry.

== Career ==
His theories were put to immediate use during his 8 years (1968–76) at the R/D Center, PPG Industries in Pittsburgh where the universality of HSP became apparent as they were shown to work equally well for problems such as optimising the compatibility of pigments within paint and ink formulations. Gradually they became adopted more widely as shown by the cumulative graph of Google Scholar citations for the phrase "Hansen Solubility Parameter".

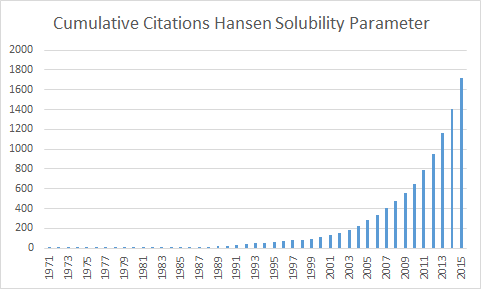

He was Director of the Scandinavian Paint & Printing Ink Research Institute in Hørsholm, Denmark from 1976 to 1985, a Senior Scientist at Hempel Group from 1985 to 1987, then Senior Scientist at FORCE Technology, Copenhagen from 1988 to 2004. Upon retirement, he became, and remains, an independent consultant.

In addition to over 130 published papers and 8 patents (h-index 25), he authored Hansen Solubility Parameters – A User's Handbook in 1999 followed by an expanded 2nd Edition in 2007. With Abbott and Yamamoto he authored the package of software, eBook, and datasets called Hansen Solubility Parameters in Practice, in 2008 which is currently in its 5th Edition.
