= List of water-miscible solvents =

The following compounds are liquid at room temperature and are completely miscible with water; they are often used as solvents. Many of them are hygroscopic.

== Organic compounds ==
| Chemical formula | Name | CAS number |
|---|---|---|
| CH_{3}CHO | acetaldehyde | 75–07–0 |
| CH_{3}CO_{2}H | acetic acid | 64–19–7 |
| (CH_{3})_{2}CO | acetone | 67–64–1 |
| CH_{3}CN | acetonitrile | 75–05–8 |
| CH_{3}CH_{2}CH(OH)CH_{2}OH | 1,2-Butanediol | 584–03–2 |
| CH_{3}CH(OH)CH_{2}CH_{2}OH | 1,3-Butanediol | 107–88–0 |
| HOCH_{2}CH_{2}CH_{2}CH_{2}OH | 1,4-Butanediol | 110–63–4 |
| C_{6}H_{14}O_{2} | 2-Butoxyethanol | 111–76–2 |
| CH_{3}CH_{2}CH_{2}COOH | butyric acid | 107–92–6 |
| HN(CH_{2}CH_{2}OH)_{2} | diethanolamine | 111–42–2 |
| HN(CH_{2}CH_{2}NH_{2})_{2} | diethylenetriamine | 111–40–0 |
| C_{4}H_{10}O_{2} | dimethoxyethane | 110–71–4 |
| (CH_{3})_{2}NC(O)H | dimethylformamide | 68–12–2 |
| C_{2}H_{8}N_{2} | 1,1-dimethylhydrazine | 57–14–7 |
| C_{2}H_{8}N_{2} | 1,2-dimethylhydrazine | 540–73–8 |
| (CH_{3})_{2}SO | dimethyl sulfoxide | 67–68–5 |
| C_{4}H_{8}O_{2} | 1,4-Dioxane | 123–91–1 |
| C_{2}H_{6}O | ethanol | 64–17–5 |
| CH_{3}CH_{2}NH_{2} | ethylamine | 75–04–7 |
| C_{2}H_{6}O_{2} | ethylene glycol | 107–21–1 |
| HCOOH | formic acid | 64–18–6 |
| C_{5}H_{6}O_{2} | furfuryl alcohol | 98–00–0 |
| C_{3}H_{8}O_{3} | glycerol | 56–81–5 |
| CH_{3}OH | methanol | 67–56–1 |
| CH_{3}N(C_{2}H_{4}OH)_{2} | methyl diethanolamine | 105–59–9 |
| CH_{3}NC | methyl isocyanide | 593–75–9 |
| C_{5}H_{9}NO | N-Methyl-2-pyrrolidone | 872–50–4 |
| CH_{3}CH_{2}CH_{2}OH | 1-Propanol | 71–23–8 |
| CH_{2}(CH_{2}OH)_{2} | 1,3-Propanediol | 504–63–2 |
| HOCH_{2}CH_{2}CH_{2}CH_{2}CH_{2}OH | 1,5-Pentanediol | 111–29–5 |
| (CH_{3})_{2}CHOH | 2-Propanol | 67–63–0 |
| CH_{3}CH_{2}COOH | propanoic acid | 79–09–4 |
| HOCH_{2}CHOHCH_{3} | propylene glycol | 57–55–6 |
| C_{5}H_{5}N | pyridine | 110–86–1 |
| C_{4}H_{8}O_{2}S | sulfolane | 126–33–0 |
| (CH_{2})_{4}O | tetrahydrofuran | 109–99–9 |
| C_{6}H_{14}O_{4} | triethylene glycol | 112–27–6 |

== Inorganic compounds ==
| Chemical formula | Name | CAS number |
|---|---|---|
| N_{2}H_{4} | hydrazine | 302–01–2 |
| HNO_{3} | nitric acid | 7697–37–2 |
| H_{2}O_{2} | hydrogen peroxide | 7722–84–1 |
| HF | hydrofluoric acid | 7664–39–3 |
| H_{2}SO_{4} | sulfuric acid | 7664–93–9 |
| HCl | hydrochloric acid | 7647–01–0 |

== See also ==
Category:Alcohol solvents
