= Hexamethylphosphoramide =

- Chemical structure of HMPA

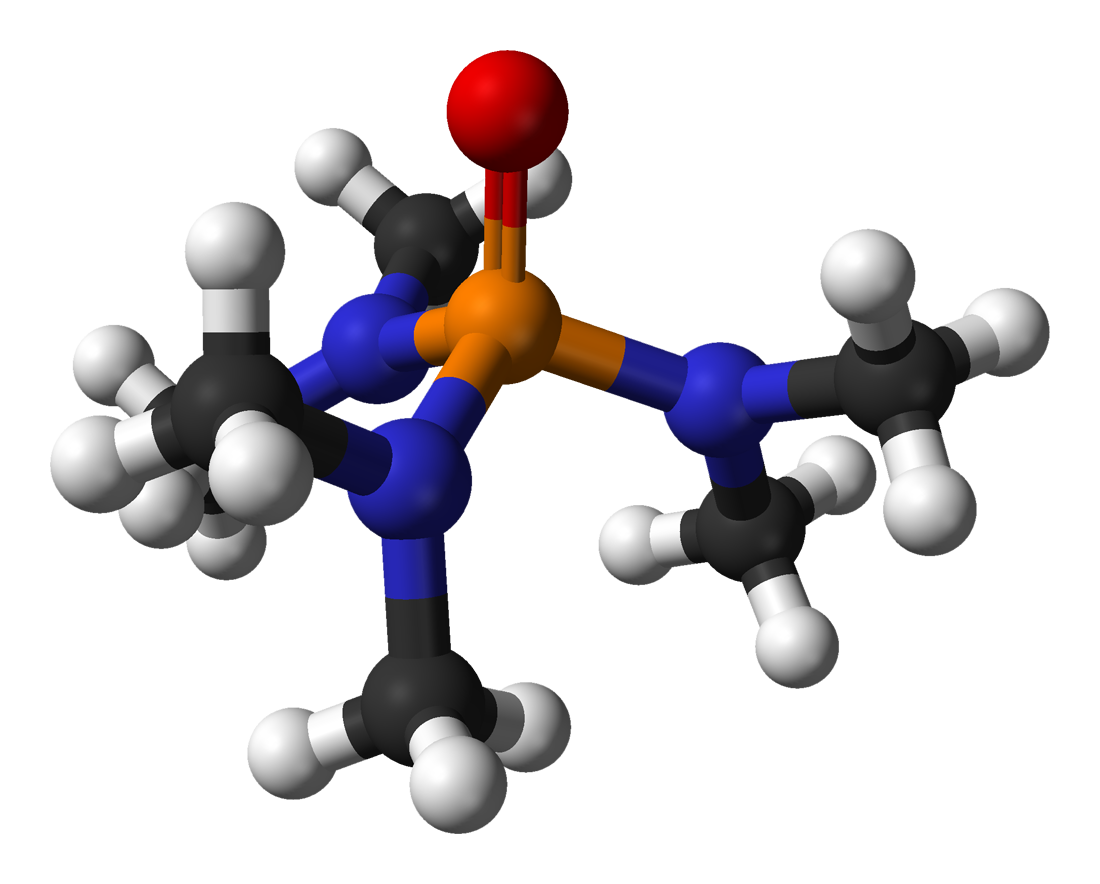
- 3D stick model of HMPA

Names
- Preferred IUPAC name Hexamethylphosphoric triamide
- Other names: Hexamethylphosphoramide; Hexametapol; HMPA; Phosphoric tris(dimethylamide); HMPT

Identifiers
CAS Number	680-31-9
3D model (JSmol)	Interactive image
Beilstein Reference	1099903
ChEBI	CHEBI:24565
ChEMBL	ChEMBL3187047
ChemSpider	12158
ECHA InfoCard	100.010.595
EC Number	211-653-8
Gmelin Reference	3259
KEGG	C19250
PubChem CID	12679
RTECS number	TD0875000
UNII	M42TU5843Z
UN number	2810 3082
CompTox Dashboard (EPA)	DTXSID6020694
- InChI: InChI=1S/C6H18N3OP/c1-7(2)11(10,8(3)4)9(5)6/h1-6H3 Key: GNOIPBMMFNIUFM-UHFFFAOYSA-N; InChI=1/C6H18N3OP/c1-7(2)11(10,8(3)4)9(5)6/h1-6H3 Key: GNOIPBMMFNIUFM-UHFFFAOYAP
- SMILES: O=P(N(C)C)(N(C)C)N(C)C

Properties
Chemical formula	C_{6}H_{18}N_{3}OP
Molar mass	179.20 g/mol
Appearance	colorless liquid
Odor	aromatic, mild, amine-like
Density	1.03 g/cm^{3}
Melting point	7.20 °C (44.96 °F; 280.35 K)
Boiling point	232.5 °C (450.5 °F; 505.6 K) CRC
Solubility in water	miscible
Vapor pressure	0.03 mmHg (4.0 Pa) at 20 °C

Hazards
- Occupational safety and health (OHS/OSH)
Main hazards	Suspected Carcinogen
- GHS labelling
Pictograms	(GHS08: Health hazard)
Signal word	Danger
Hazard statements	H340, H350
Precautionary statements	P201, P202, P281, P308+P313, P405, P501
Flash point	104.4 °C (219.9 °F; 377.5 K)
- NIOSH (US health exposure limits)
PEL (Permissible)	none
REL (Recommended)	Ca
IDLH (Immediate danger)	Ca [N.D.]
Safety data sheet (SDS)	Oxford MSDS
- Except where otherwise noted, data are given for materials in their standard state (at 25 °C [77 °F], 100 kPa). verify (what is ?) Infobox references

Hexamethylphosphoramide, often abbreviated HMPA, is a phosphoramide (an amide of phosphoric acid) with the formula [(CH_{3})_{2}N]_{3}PO. This colorless liquid is used as a solvent in organic synthesis.

== Structure and reactivity ==
HMPA is the oxide of tris(dimethylamino)phosphine, P(NMe_{2})_{3}. Like other phosphine oxides (such as triphenylphosphine oxide), the molecule has a tetrahedral core and a P=O bond that is highly polarized, with significant negative charge residing on the oxygen atom.

Compounds containing a nitrogen–phosphorus bond typically are degraded by hydrochloric acid to form a protonated amine and phosphate.

It dissolves alkali metal salts and alkali metals, forming blue solutions which are stable for a few hours. Solvated electrons are present in these blue solutions.

== Applications ==
HMPA is a specialty solvent for polymers, gases, and organometallic compounds. It improves the selectivity of lithiation reactions by breaking up the oligomers of lithium bases such as butyllithium. Because HMPA selectively solvates cations, it accelerates otherwise slow S_{N}2 reactions by generating more bare anions. The basic nitrogen centers in HMPA coordinate strongly to Li^{+}.

HMPA is a ligand in the useful reagents based on molybdenum peroxide complexes, for example, MoO(O_{2})_{2}(HMPA)(H_{2}O) is used as an oxidant in organic synthesis.

== Alternative reagents ==
Dimethyl sulfoxide can often be used in place of HMPA as a cosolvent. Both are strong hydrogen bond acceptors, and their oxygen atoms bind metal cations. Other alternatives to HMPA include the N,N′-tetraalkylureas DMPU (dimethylpropyleneurea) or DMI (1,3-dimethyl-2-imidazolidinone). Tripyrrolidinophosphoric acid triamide (TPPA) has been reported to be a good substitute reagent for HMPA in reductions with samarium diiodide and as a Lewis base additive to many reactions involving samarium ketyls.

== Toxicity ==
HMPA is only mildly toxic but has been shown to cause cancer in rats. HMPA can be degraded by the action of hydrochloric acid.
