= Aircraft structures technician =

Technician in the Canadian armed forces

Aircraft structures technician is an occupation in the Canadian Forces. Aircraft structure technicians (ACS techs) are responsible for the maintenance and repair of aircraft components and structures.

== Background ==
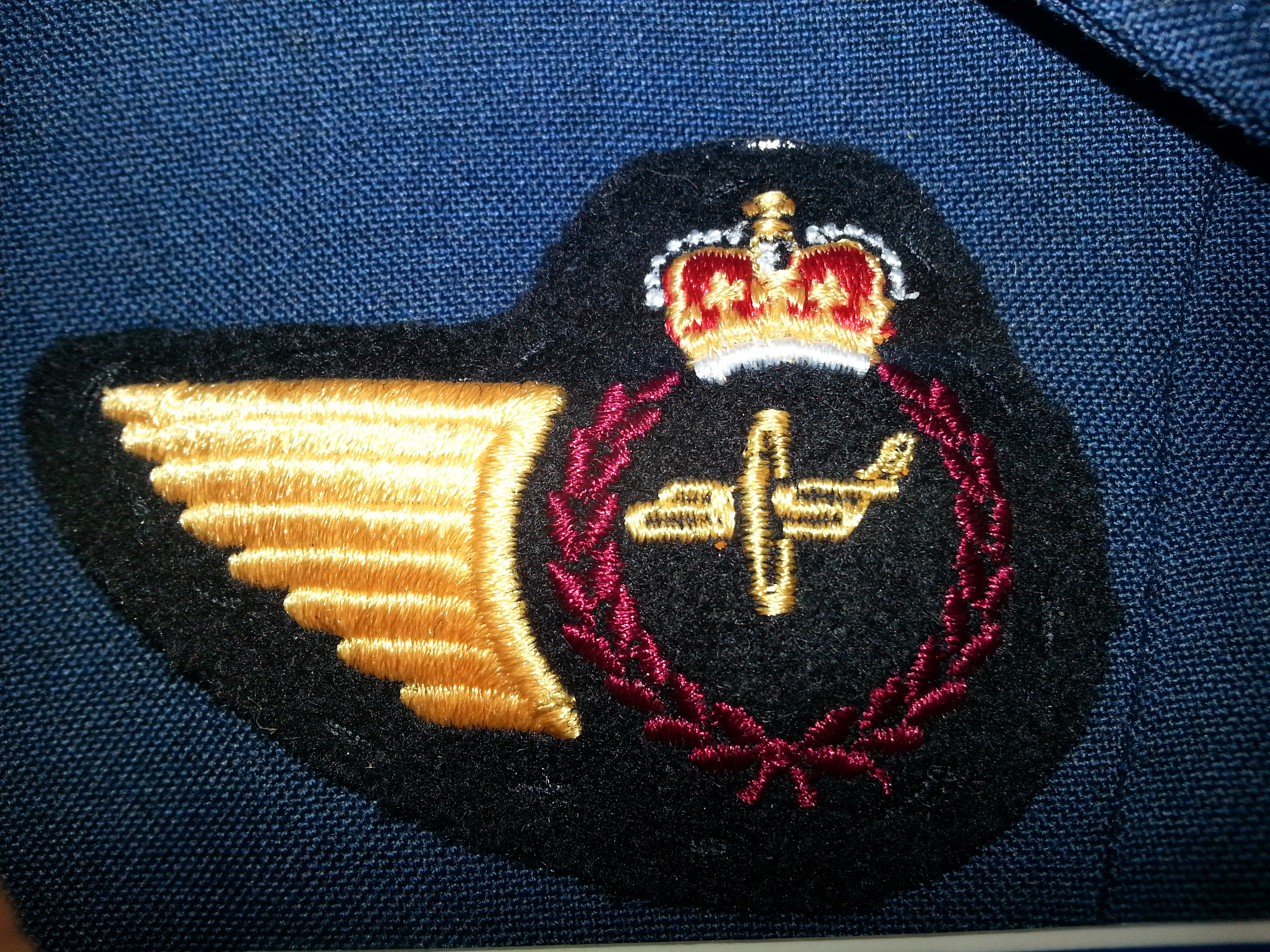
ACS trade badge

The aircraft structures (ACS) trade was brought about during a time of fiscal constraints for the Canadian Forces. The ACS trade is an amalgamation of three aircraft maintenance trade (machinist, aircraft refinisher, and metal fabrication). The trade was officially integrated into the RCAF in January 1997.

ACS techs perform multiple aircraft maintenance activities on and off the aircraft, such as sheet metal repair and fabrication, aircraft refinishing, industrial sewing, machining, and composite work. ACS techs can further their skills by applying for Occupational Specialty Qualification courses (OSQ), which can include quality assurance special metals welding, advanced composite repair, helicopter rotor blade repair, and special purpose machining.

ACS techs may also be employed to conduct elementary aircraft servicing tasks such as aircraft towing, aircraft starts, aircraft jacking, before flight check (B-check), after flight checks (A-check), as well as replenishing aircraft systems including fuels, lubricants, hydraulics, and all aircraft technical administration (paperwork).

== Eligibility and educational objectives ==
ACS techs must have successfully passed the 9-week Basic Military Qualification (BMQ) course at the Canadian Forces Leadership and Recruit School in Saint-Jean-sur-Richelieu, Quebec. After graduating from BMQ, ACS techs have the opportunity to have part or all of their training take place at subsidised civilian technical colleges, or to train through the Canadian Forces School of Aerospace Technology and Engineering (CFSATE) at CFB Borden, Ontario.

At CFSATE, ACS Techs go through an initial 8 week course on general maintenance and servicing applicable to all aircraft types. After this point, ACS Techs are assigned to their first squadron. After gaining experience, ACS techs return to CFSATE to undergo a 26 week course. Some of the topics covered are; user maintenance on tools and equipment, aircraft servicing duties, corrosion control, protective coatings and markings, textiles, machining, welding, aircraft structural repairs, and composites, life-support system maintenance and plastics.

== Maintenance authorizations ==
Upon completion of the ACS course, ACS techs are posted to a Royal Canadian Air Force unit and begin their apprenticeship. The apprenticeship lasts from between 18 and 24 months, where they complete their apprenticeship log book. The log book consists of 22 task areas with numerous sub-tasks that must be completed before achieving performance of maintenance (POM). Due to the inexperience of all new apprentices, ACS apprentices are supervised by a qualified peer or supervisor while they are conducting aircraft maintenance repairs.

POM is the ability to be able to work alone and "sign" for work completed, however, all POM work projects must be inspected, and the paperwork can then be closed by the qualified technician. POMs are also the working force of the trade. After four years of working on aircraft, showing confidence, and the ability to perform aircraft maintenance properly, POMs can be recommended for level "A" authorization.

"A" Level is the authorization that allows a POM to sign for work and apprentices work. Level "A" signatories typically tend to do more paperwork than hands on work, as they are required to inspect all POM paperwork. The level "A" signature certifies that the POM conducted a safe repair and that the associated paperwork is filled out completely and properly. As the level "A" personnel are the only ones who can be granted the assessors authorization, they are also the teaching force for ACS apprentices. Assessors are the only personnel who can sign off apprentice sub-tasks as well as task areas, thus assessing their development as a technician.

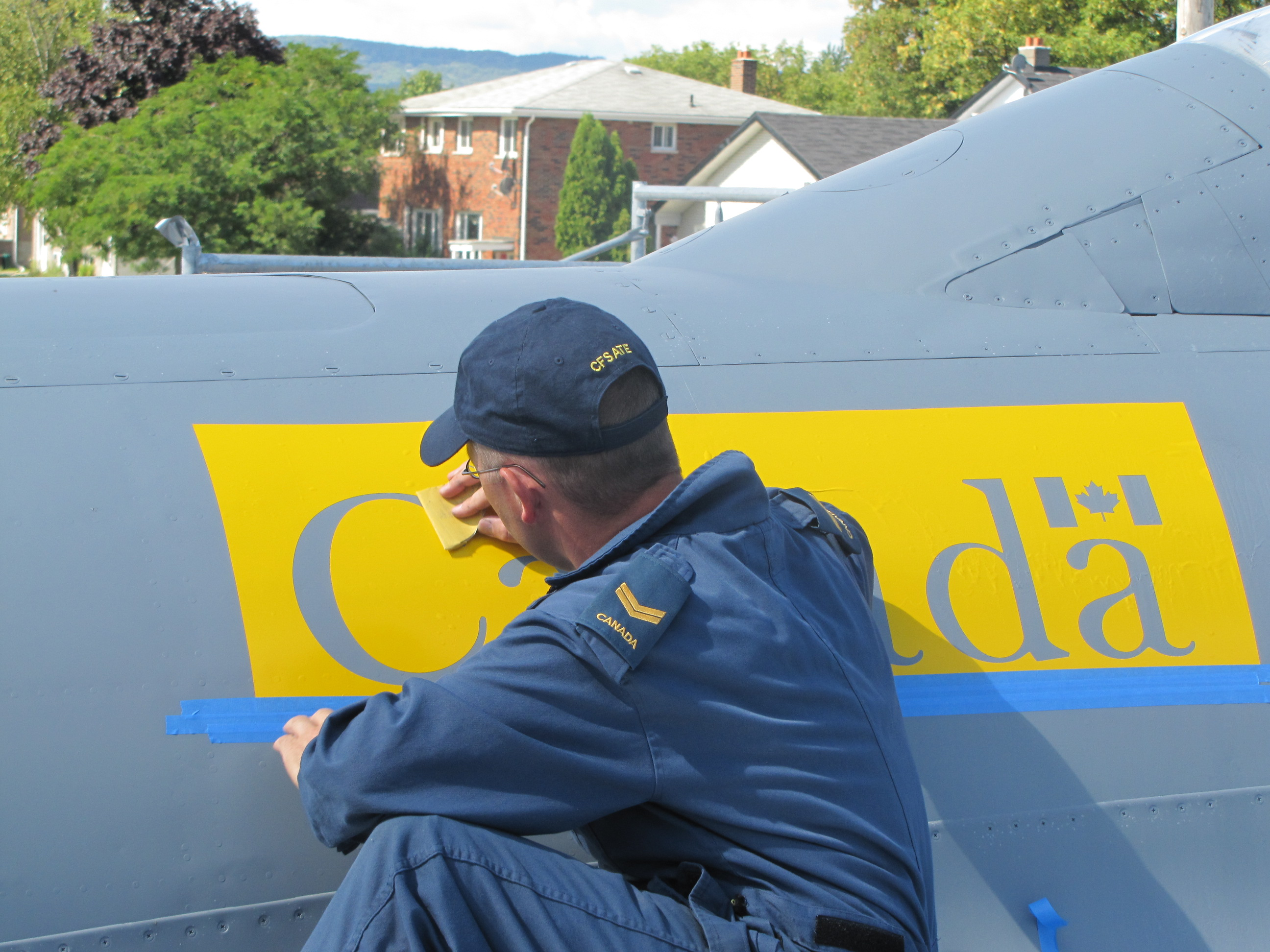
A CFSATE student applying aircraft stencils

== Working environment ==
ACS techs typically work in shops and on hangar floors, but can also find themselves on ships, in the field, or on deployment to the Arctic or throughout theworld. Repairs for some aircraft structures can be difficult to access, so aircraft stands, awkward positions, or confined space entry may be required. ACS techs are required to lift and move heavy stock, materials, parts and equipment, and are regularly required to work long hours in a standing position, sometimes wearing full chemical suits with boots, gloves, and respirator, inside a heated paint booth.

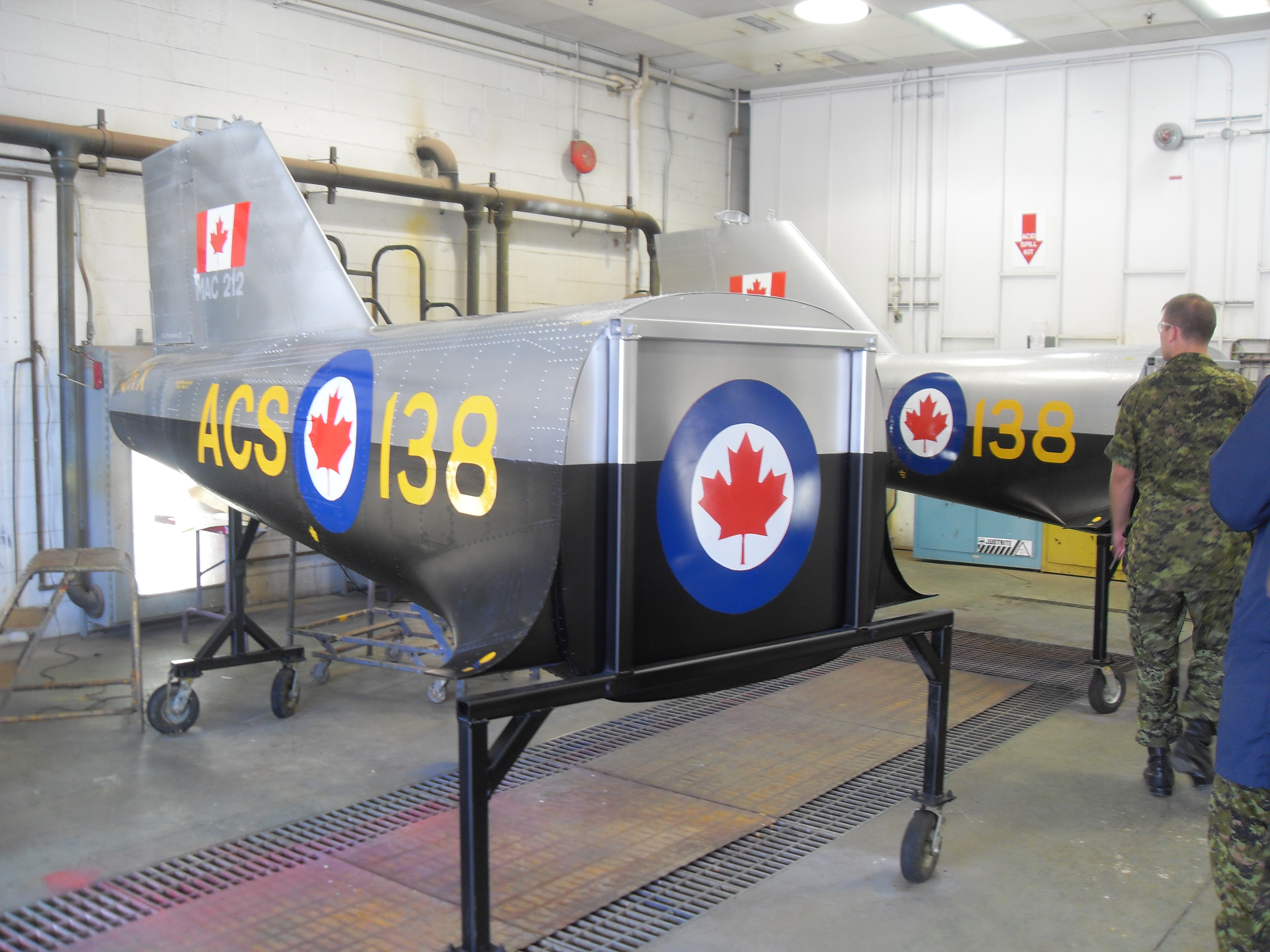
Tail sections students of CFSATE practice their skills

== Occupational hazards ==
ACS techs regularly come in contact with hazardous chemicals and materials, which include: Polyurethane paints, methyl ethyl ketone (MEK), zinc chromate paint primers, oils, jet fuel, paint strippers, and paint thinners. ACS techs are also exposed to noise, fumes, dust, odors, carcinogenic materials, and UV (welding) flashes. ACS techs use personal protective equipment (PPE) to reduce the risk of injury, but additional medical tests are used to monitor a technician's health above what is standard for most other Canadian Forces trades.

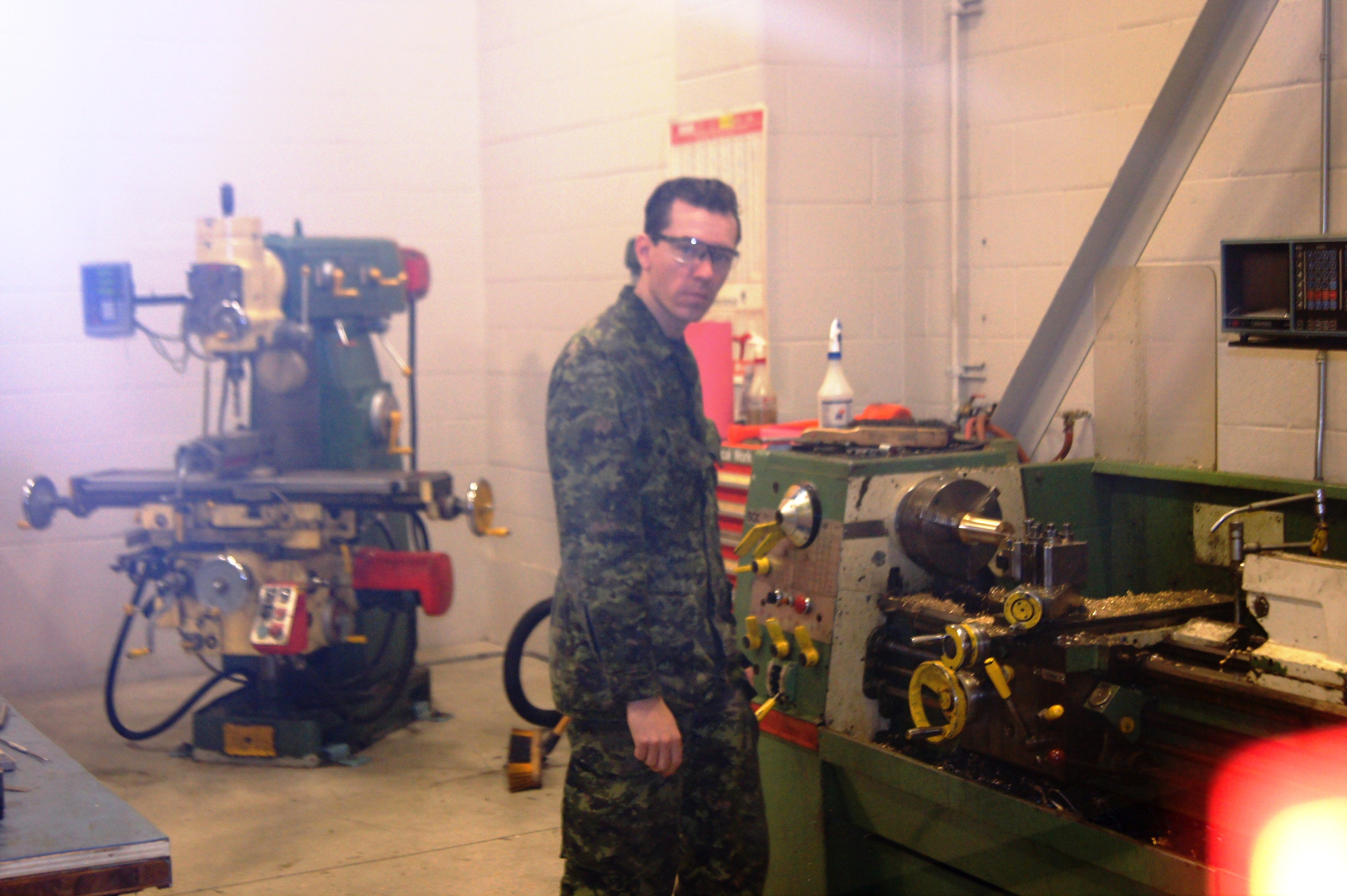
An ACS tech in an ACS machine shop
