= Lacquer thinner =

Solvents able to dissolve lacquer

Lacquer thinner, also known as cellulose thinner, is usually a mixture of solvents able to dissolve a number of different resins or plastics used in modern lacquer.

Previously, lacquer thinners frequently contained alkyl esters like butyl or amyl acetate, ketones like acetone or methyl ethyl ketone, aromatic hydrocarbons like toluene, ethers such as glycol cellosolves, and/or alcohols.

Modern lacquer thinners increasingly have to comply with low-volatile organic compounds (VOC) regulations. Often, these formulations consist mostly of acetone and other simple ketones with very small quantities of aromatic solvents.

Paints that dry by simple solvent evaporation and contain solid binders are known as lacquers. When the solvent in lacquer paints evaporates, a solid layer remains. Since this layer can be dissolved again with the solvent, each lacquer can dissolve the one below it.

== See also ==
- Paint thinner
