= DMPU =

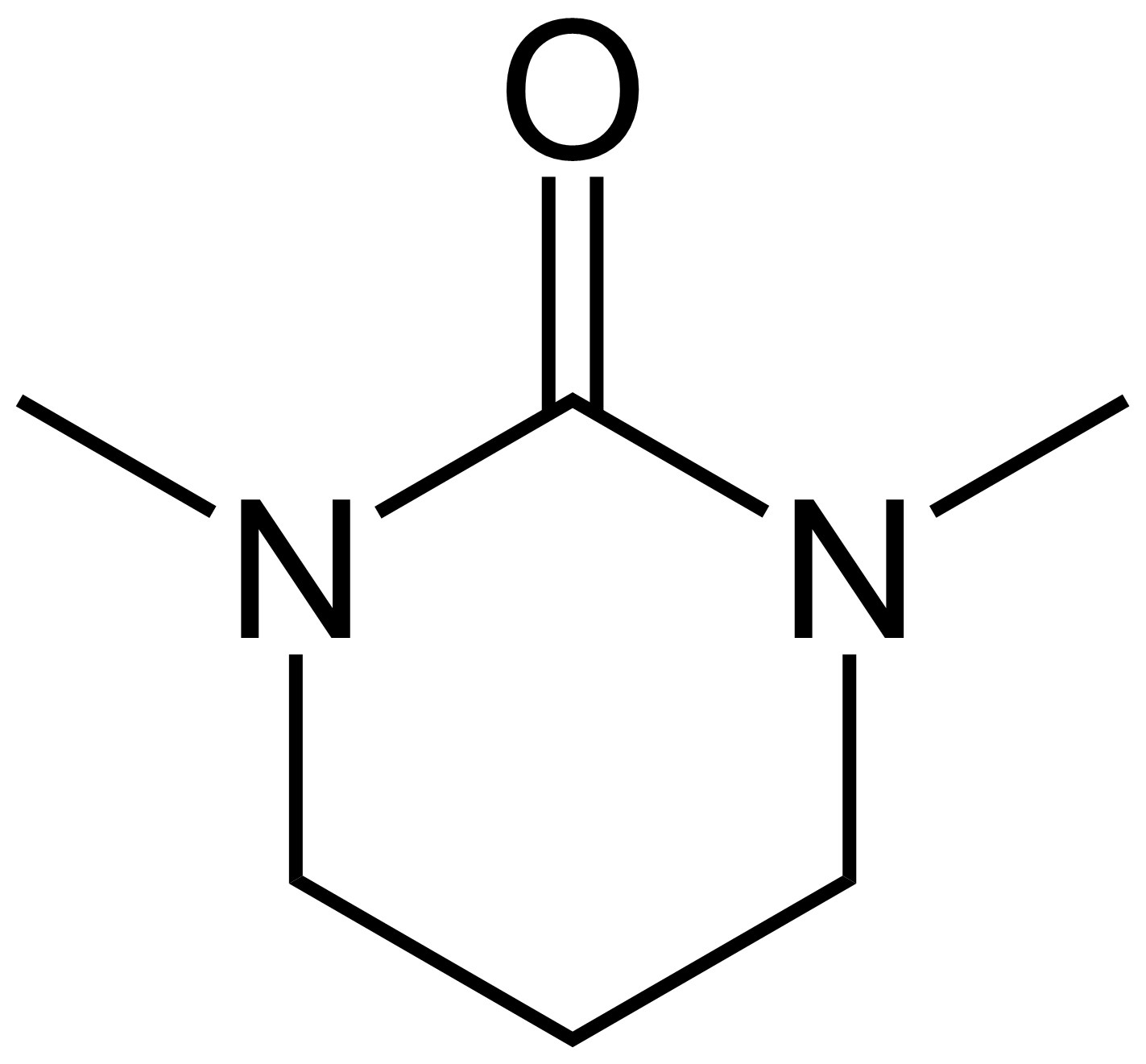

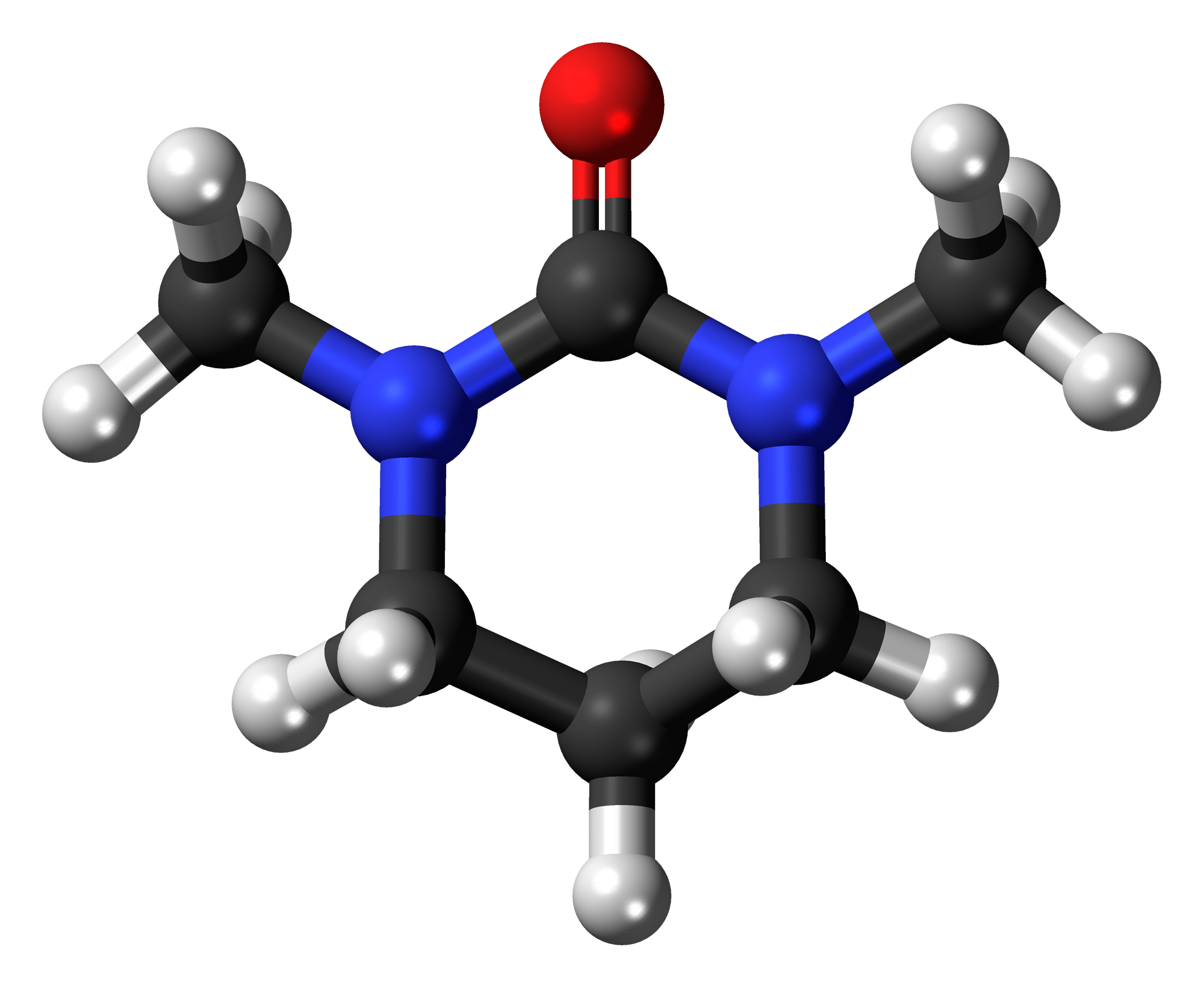

Names
- Preferred IUPAC name 1,3-Dimethyl-1,3-diazinan-2-one
- Other names N,N′-Dimethyl-N,N′-trimethyleneurea; N,N′-Dimethylpropyleneurea; 1,3-Dimethyl-3,4,5,6-tetrahydro-2(1H)-pyrimidinone

Identifiers
CAS Number	7226-23-5
3D model (JSmol)	Interactive image
Abbreviations	DMPU
ChEMBL	ChEMBL12284
ChemSpider	73671
ECHA InfoCard	100.027.841
EC Number	230-625-6
PubChem CID	81646
CompTox Dashboard (EPA)	DTXSID3074575
- InChI: InChI=1S/C6H12N2O/c1-7-4-3-5-8(2)6(7)9/h3-5H2,1-2H3 Key: GUVUOGQBMYCBQP-UHFFFAOYSA-N; InChI=1/C6H12N2O/c1-7-4-3-5-8(2)6(7)9/h3-5H2,1-2H3 Key: GUVUOGQBMYCBQP-UHFFFAOYAB
- SMILES: O=C1N(C)CCCN1C

Properties
Chemical formula	C_{6}H_{12}N_{2}O
Molar mass	128.175 g·mol^{−1}
Density	1.064 g/cm^{3}
Melting point	−20 °C; −4 °F; 253 K
Boiling point	246.5 °C (475.7 °F; 519.6 K) (Source)
Solubility in water	miscible
Refractive index (n_{D})	1.4875-1.4895

Hazards
- GHS labelling
Pictograms	(GHS05: Corrosive) (GHS07: Exclamation mark) (GHS09: Environmental hazard)
Signal word	Danger
Hazard statements	H302, H318, H361f
Precautionary statements	P201, P202, P264, P270, P280, P281, P301+P312, P305+P351+P338, P308+P313, P310, P330, P405, P501
Flash point	121 °C (250 °F; 394 K)
Safety data sheet (SDS)	External MSDS
- Except where otherwise noted, data are given for materials in their standard state (at 25 °C [77 °F], 100 kPa). verify (what is ?) Infobox references

N,N′-Dimethylpropyleneurea (DMPU) is a cyclic urea sometimes used as a polar, aprotic organic solvent. Along with the dimethylethyleneurea, it was introduced as an analog of tetramethylurea.

In 1985, Dieter Seebach showed that it is possible to replace the suspected carcinogen hexamethylphosphoramide (HMPA) with DMPU.
