= Chronic solvent-induced encephalopathy =

Neurological condition caused by exposure to organic solvents

Chronic solvent-induced encephalopathy (CSE) is a condition induced by long-term exposure to organic solvents, often—but not always—in the workplace, that lead to a wide variety of persisting sensorimotor polyneuropathies and neurobehavioral deficits even after solvent exposure has been removed. This syndrome can also be referred to as psycho-organic syndrome, organic solvent syndrome, chronic painter's syndrome, occupational solvent encephalopathy, solvent intoxication, toxic solvent syndrome, painters disease, chronic toxic encephalopathy, or neurasthenic syndrome. The multiple names of solvent-induced syndromes combined with inconsistency in research methods makes referencing this disease difficult and its catalog of symptoms vague.

== Symptoms and signs ==
Two characteristic symptoms of CSE are deterioration of memory (particularly short-term memory), and attention impairments. There are, however, numerous other symptoms that accompany to varying degrees. Variability in the research methods studying CSE makes characterizing these symptoms difficult, and some may be questionable regarding whether they are actual symptoms of solvent-induced syndromes, simply because of how infrequently they appear. Characterizing of CSE symptoms is more difficult because CSE is currently poorly defined, and the mechanism behind it is not understood yet.

=== Neurological ===
Reported neurological symptoms include difficulty sleeping, decrease in intellectual capacity, dizziness, altered visual perceptive abilities, affected psychomotor skills, forgetfulness, and disorientation. The mechanism behind these symptoms beyond solvent molecules crossing the blood–brain barrier is currently unknown. Neurological signs include impaired vibratory sensation at extremities and an inability to maintain steady motion, a possible effect from psychomotor damage in the brain. Other symptoms that have been seen include fatigue, decreased strength, and unusual gait. One study found that there was a correlation between decreased red blood cell count and level of solvent exposure, but not enough data has been found to support any blood tests to screen for CSE.

=== Sensory alterations ===
A 1988 study indicated that some solvent-exposed workers developed loss of smell or damage to color vision; however this may or may not have been actually caused by exposure to organic solvents. There is other evidence for subtle impairment of color vision (especially impairment of Tritan color or "blue-yellow" color discernment), synergistic exacerbation of hearing loss, and loss of the sense of smell (anosmia).

=== Psychological ===
Psychological symptoms of CSE that have been reported include mood swings, increased irritability, depression, a lack of initiative, uncontrollable and intense displays of emotion such as spontaneous laughing or crying, and a severe lack of interest in sex. Some psychological symptoms are believed to be linked to frustration with other symptoms, neurological, or pathophysiological symptoms of CSE. A case study of a painter diagnosed with CSE reported that the patient frequently felt defensive, irritable, and depressed because of his memory deficiencies.

== Causes ==
Organic solvents that cause CSE are characterized as volatile, blood soluble, lipophilic compounds that are typically liquids at normal temperature. These can be compounds or mixtures used to extract, dissolve, or suspend non-water-soluble materials such as fats, oils, lipids, cellulose derivatives, waxes, plastics, and polymers. These solvents are often used industrially in the production of paints, glues, coatings, degreasing agents, dyes, polymers, pharmaceuticals, and printing inks. Some common organic solvents known to cause CSE include formaldehyde, acetates, and alcohols.

Exposure to solvents can occur by inhalation, ingestion, or direct absorption through the skin. Of the three, inhalation is the most common form of exposure, with the solvent able to rapidly pass through lung membranes and then into fatty tissue or cell membranes. Once in the bloodstream, organic solvents easily cross the blood–brain barrier, due to their lipophilic properties. However, the sequence of effects that these solvents have on the brain is not yet fully understood.

== Diagnosis ==
Due to its non-specific nature, diagnosing CSE requires a multidisciplinary "Solvent Team" typically consisting of a neurologist, occupational physician, occupational hygienist, neuropsychologist, and sometimes a psychiatrist or toxicologist. Together, the team of specialists assess the patient's history of exposure, symptoms, and course of symptom development relative to the amount and duration of exposure, presence of neurological signs, and any existing neuropsychological impairment.

Furthermore, CSE must be diagnosed "by exclusion". This means that all other possible causes of the patient's symptoms must first be ruled out beforehand. Because screening and assessing for CSE is a complex and time-consuming procedure requiring several specialists of multiple fields, few cases of CSE are formally diagnosed in the medical field. This may, in part, be a reason for the syndrome's lack of widespread recognition. The solvents responsible for neurological effects dissipate quickly after an exposure, leaving only indirect evidence of their presence, in the form of temporary or permanent impairments.

Brain imaging techniques which have been explored in research have shown little promise as alternative methods to diagnose CSE. Neuroradiology and functional imaging have shown mild cortical atrophy, and effects in dopamine-mediated frontostriatal circuits in some cases. Examinations of regional cerebral blood flow in some imaging techniques have also shown some cerebrovascular abnormalities in patients with CSE, but the data were not different enough from healthy patients to be considered significant. The most promising brain imaging technique being studied currently is functional magnetic resonance imaging (fMRI) but as of now, no specific brain imaging techniques are available to reliably diagnose CSE.

=== Classification ===
Introduced by a working group from the World Health Organization (WHO) in 1985, WHO diagnostic criteria states that CSE can occur in three stages, organic affective syndrome (type I), mild chronic toxic encephalopathy (type II), and severe chronic toxic encephalopathy (type III). Shortly after, a workshop in Raleigh-Durham, NC (United States) released a second diagnostic criterion which recognizes four stages as symptoms only (type 1), sustained personality or mood swings (type 2A), impairment of intellectual function (type 2B), and dementia (type 3). Though not identical, the WHO and Raleigh criteria are relatively comparable. WHO type I and Raleigh types 1 and 2A are believed to encompass the same stages of CSE, and WHO type II and Raleigh type 2B both involve deficiencies in memory and attention. No other international classifications for CSE have been proposed, and neither the WHO nor Raleigh criteria have been uniformly accepted for epidemiological studies.

== Treatment ==
Like diagnosis, treating CSE is difficult because it is vaguely defined and data on the mechanism of CSE effects on neural tissue are lacking. There is no existing treatment that is effective at completely recovering any neurological or physical function lost due to CSE. This is believed to be because of the limited regeneration capabilities in the central nervous system. Furthermore, existing symptoms of CSE can potentially worsen with age. Some symptoms of CSE, such as depression and sleep issues, can be treated separately, and therapy is available to help patients adjust to any untreatable disabilities. Current management for CSE involves treating accompanying psychopathology, symptoms, and preventing further deterioration.

== History ==
Cases of CSE have been studied predominantly in northern Europe, though documented cases have been found in other countries such as the United States, France, and China. The first documented evidence for CSE was in the early 1960s from a paper published by Helena Hanninen, a Finnish neuropsychologist. Her paper described a case of workers who developed carbon disulfide intoxication at a rubber manufacturing company and coined the term "psycho-organic syndrome". Studies of solvent effects on intellectual functioning, memory, and concentration were carried out in the Nordic countries, with Denmark spearheading the research. Growing awareness of the syndrome in the Nordic countries occurred in the 1970s.

To reduce cases of CSE in the workforce, a diagnostic criterion for CSE appeared on information notices in occupational disease records in the European Commission. Following, from 1998 to 2004, was a health surveillance program for CSE cases among construction painters in the Netherlands. By 2000, a ban was put into action against using solvent-based paints indoors, which resulted in a considerable reduction of solvent exposure to painters. As a result, the number of CSE cases dropped substantially after 2002. In 2005–2007, no new CSE cases were diagnosed among construction painters in the Netherlands, and no occupational CSE has been encountered in workers under thirty years of age in Finland since 1995.

Though movements to reduce CSE have been successful, CSE still poses an issue to many workers that are at occupational risk. Statistics published in 2012 by Nicole Cherry et al. claim that at least 20% of employees in Finland still encounter organic solvents at the workplace, and 10% of them experience some form of disadvantage from the exposure. In Norway, 11% of the male population of workers and 7% of female workers are still exposed to solvents daily and as of 2006, the country has the highest rate of diagnosed CSE in Europe. Furthermore, due to the complexity of screening for CSE, there is still a high likelihood of a population of undiagnosed cases.

Occupations that have been found to have higher risk of causing CSE are painter, printer, industrial cleaner, and paint or glue manufacturer. Of them, painters have been found to have the highest recorded incidence of CSE. Spray painters in particular have higher exposure intensities than other painters. Studies of instances of CSE have specifically been carried out in naval dockyards, mineral fiber manufacturing companies, and rayon viscose plants.
