= 1,3-Dimethyl-2-imidazolidinone =

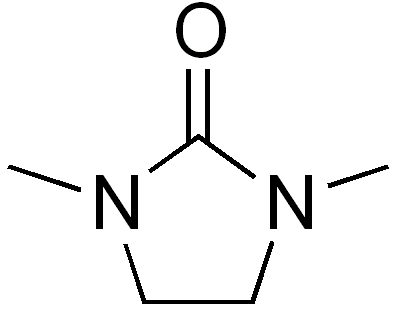

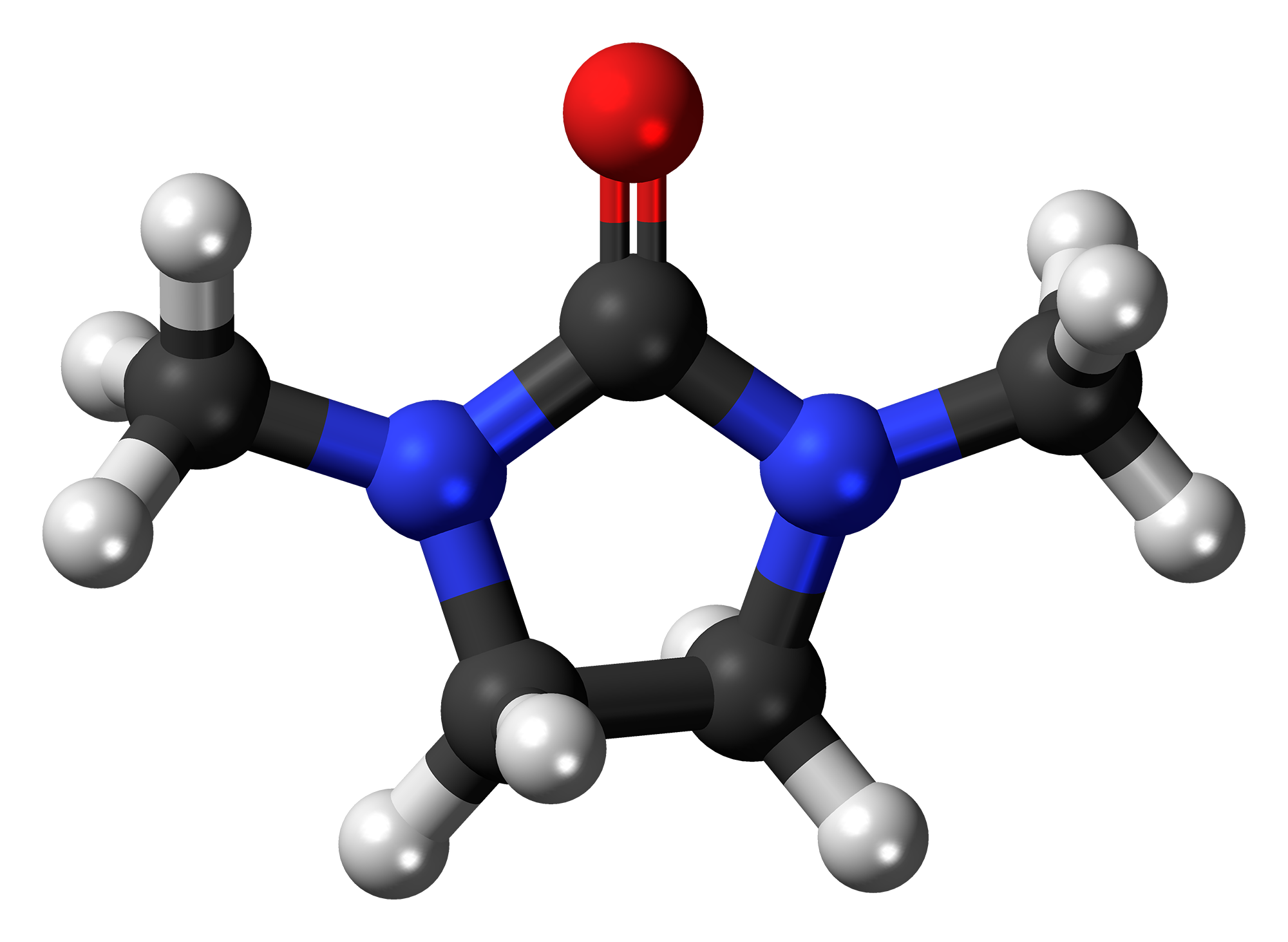

Names
- Preferred IUPAC name 1,3-Dimethylimidazolidin-2-one
- Other names Dimethylethyleneurea; N,N′-Dimethylimidazolidinone

Identifiers
CAS Number	80-73-9
3D model (JSmol)	Interactive image; Interactive image
Abbreviations	DMI
ChEMBL	ChEMBL12338
ChemSpider	6409
ECHA InfoCard	100.001.187
PubChem CID	6661
UNII	5C1YQQ9M90
CompTox Dashboard (EPA)	DTXSID1073153
- InChI: InChI=1S/C5H10N2O/c1-6-3-4-7(2)5(6)8/h3-4H2,1-2H3 Key: CYSGHNMQYZDMIA-UHFFFAOYSA-N; InChI=1/C5H10N2O/c1-6-3-4-7(2)5(6)8/h3-4H2,1-2H3 Key: CYSGHNMQYZDMIA-UHFFFAOYAB
- SMILES: O=C1N(C)CCN1C; CN1CCN(C1=O)C

Properties
Chemical formula	C_{5}H_{10}N_{2}O
Molar mass	114.1457
Appearance	colorless liquid
Melting point	8.2 °C (46.8 °F; 281.3 K)
Boiling point	225 °C (437 °F; 498 K)

Hazards
Flash point	120 °C (248 °F; 393 K)
- Except where otherwise noted, data are given for materials in their standard state (at 25 °C [77 °F], 100 kPa). verify (what is ?) Infobox references

1,3-Dimethyl-2-imidazolidinone (DMI) is a cyclic urea used as a high-boiling polar aprotic solvent. This colourless, highly polar solvent has high thermal and chemical stability. Together with homologous solvent DMPU, since the 1970s it serves as an analog of tetramethylurea. It can be prepared from 1,2-dimethylethylenediamine by reaction with phosgene.

== History ==
In 1940 Du Pont applied for a patent on acetylene storage in many polar organic solvents, one of which was 1,3-dimethyl-2-imidazolidone. The company filed another patent on a method of synthesizing the same compound, albeit called s-dimethylethyleneurea, in 1944.

Soon thereafter William Boon from the Imperial Chemical Industries published a different synthesis method of what he called 1:3-dimethyliminazolidine-2-one. The compound was more closely studied in the 1960s, with its adoption as a solvent starting in the 1970s.

== Solvent ==
DMI has excellent solvating ability for both inorganic and organic compounds. In many applications, DMI (as well as DMPU) can be used as a substitute or replacement for the carcinogenic solvent HMPA. Compared to the 6-atom ring analog, it has an advantage of lower viscosity (1.9 vs. 2.9 cP at 25 °C).

DMI is used in a variety of applications including detergents, dyestuffs, electronic materials and in the manufacture of polymers.

DMI is toxic in contact with skin.
