= Reductions with samarium(II) iodide =

Chemical reactions

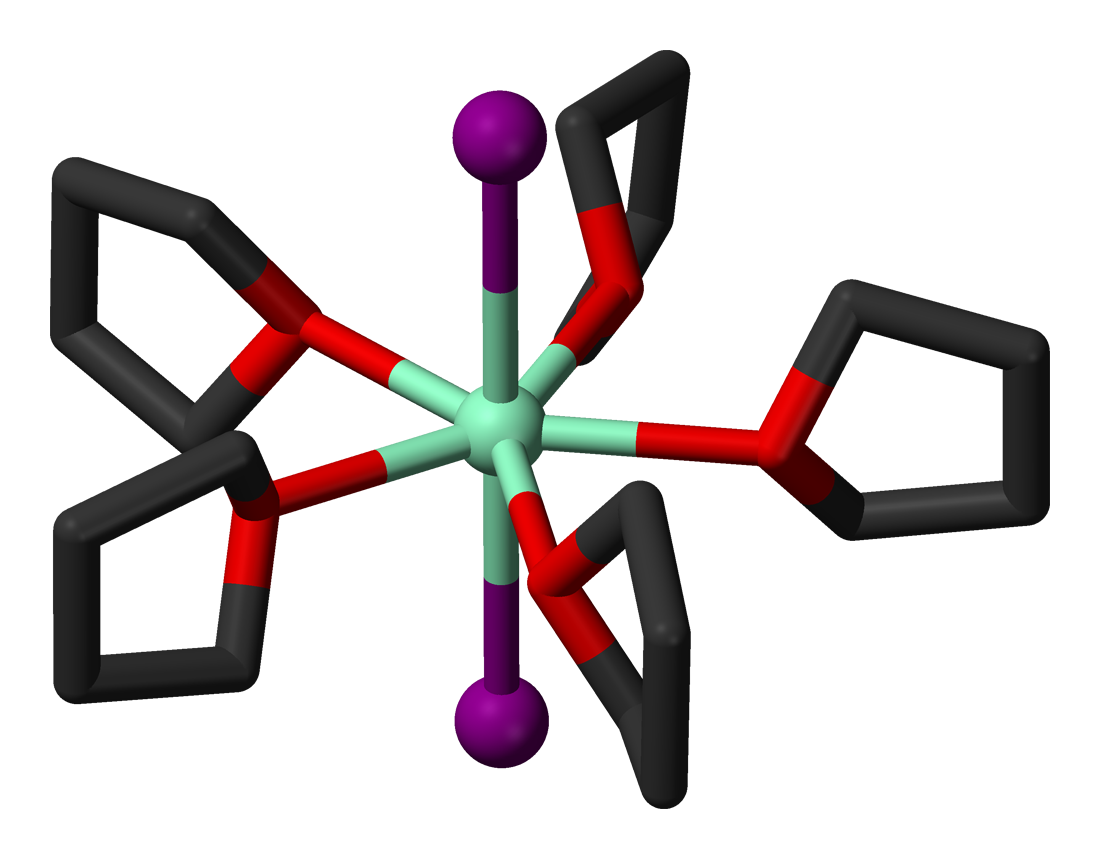
Structure of SmI_{2}(thf)_{5}.

Reductions with samarium(II) iodide involve the conversion of various classes of organic compounds into reduced products through the action of samarium(II) iodide, a mild one-electron reducing agent.

== History ==
In 1979, Henri Kagan observed the reduction of a variety of organic functional groups by samarium(II) iodide under mild conditions. Since that time, samarium(II) iodide has been employed in a variety of contexts in organic synthesis for both functional group manipulation and carbon-carbon bond formation.

Samarium(II) iodide is a one-electron reductant, and typically effects reduction through a series of electron transfer and proton transfer (from protic solvent) steps. Reducible functional groups include:

- α-Functionalized carbonyl compounds
- Ketones and aldehydes
- Carboxylic acids (under strongly acidic or basic conditions)
- Organic halides
- Nitro compounds

Some examples of functionality reduced by SmI_{2} are provided below.

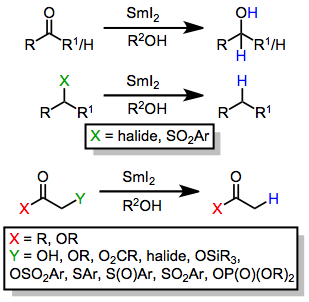

The reactivity of SmI_{2} is significantly affected by the choice of solvent. The use of hexamethylphosphoramide (HMPA) as a co-solvent in samarium(II) iodide reductions allows the reaction to be carried out under much milder conditions than in its absence. It has recently been investigated and determined that tripyrrolidinophosphoric acid triamide (TPPA) can be used in lieu of HMPA as an activator for SmI_{2} reductions, producing faster reactions and similar yields while avoiding the use of a known carcinogen. In general, polar solvents increase the reducing properties of samarium(II) iodide.

== Mechanism and stereochemistry ==
=== Reductions of organic halides ===
In the presence of samarium(II) iodide, the halogen atom of alkyl, alkenyl, and aryl halides is replaced by hydrogen. In tetrahydrofuran, the mechanism of alkyl halide reduction likely proceeds through radical intermediates. However, alkyl halide reductions employing HMPA as a co-solvent likely involve a large proportion of organosamarium intermediates. A unified mechanistic picture is shown below. Initial electron transfer and loss of halide generate an organic radical, which may combine with a second molecule of samarium(II) iodide to form an organosamarium species. Protonation of this species then yields the reduced product. Alternatively, the intermediate organic radical may abstract a hydrogen atom from the solvent S–H.

$\begin{array}{r}{}\\ \ce{R-X ->[\ce{SmI2}][-\ce{SmI2X}] [R.] ->} \begin{Bmatrix} \ce{->[\ce{SmI2}][\text{R = alkyl}] R-SmI2 ->[\ce{H-X}]}\\{}\\ \ce{->[\ce{Solv-H}][\ce{-Solv^.}]} \end{Bmatrix} \ce{-> {R-H} + SmI2X}\\ \text{R = aryl, alkenyl} \end{array}$	3

Reactions of aryl and alkenyl halides involve only radical intermediates; reduction of the intermediate radicals to organosamariums is evidently slower than hydrogen atom abstraction from the solvent.

If a substituent is present in the β position of the alkyl halide, reductive fragmentation to a diastereomeric mixture of alkenes may occur. β-Elimination of the intermediate organosamarium species leads to the observed products.

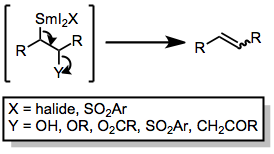
4

=== Reductions of aldehydes and ketones ===
The mechanism of reductions of aldehydes and ketones by samarium(II) iodide is based primarily on mechanisms elucidated for similar one-electron reducing agents. Upon single-electron transfer, a ketyl dimer iv forms. In the absence of protic solvent, this dimer collapses to form 1,2-diols. In the presence of a proton source, however, the dimer may undergo either disproportionation to form a samarium alkoxide and carbonyl compound, or protonation to form a carbinol radical ii followed by a second reduction and protonation, yielding an alcohol.

(5)

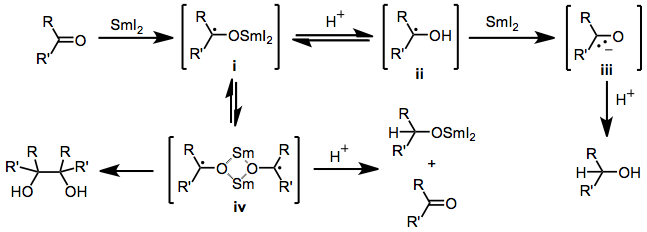

=== Reductions of α-functionalized carbonyl compounds ===
α-Functionalized carbonyl compounds are reduced to the corresponding unfunctionalized carbonyl compounds in the presence of samarium(II) iodide. This process may be initiated by initial electron transfer to either the substituent at the α position or the carbonyl moiety, depending on the relative electron affinity of the functional groups. A second reduction immediately follows, after which either protonation or elimination-tautomerization affords the product.

(6)

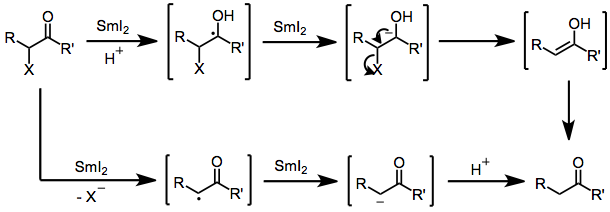

=== Reductions of nitro compounds ===
Nitro compounds may be reduced to either the hydroxylamine or amine oxidation level with samarium(II) iodide, depending on the conditions employed. Electron transfer, followed by proton transfer and elimination generates an intermediate nitroso compound, which undergoes two more rounds of electron transfer and protonation to afford the hydroxylamine. Further reduction of the hydroxylamine leads to the amine.

(7)

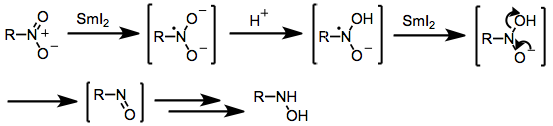

== Scope and limitations ==
Alkyl halides are reduced by samarium(II) iodide to the corresponding alkanes. The conditions of the reduction are compatible with a variety of functional groups, including alcohols, arenes, alkenes, and esters. Aryl halides are reduced to the corresponding halogen-free aromatic compounds.

(8)

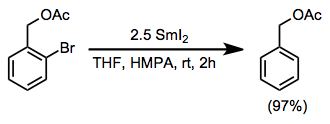

Reductive fragmentation of β-substituted alkyl halides affords diastereomeric mixtures of alkenes. Good leaving groups for this process include hydroxide, alkoxides, carboxylates, and enolates. Readily available cyclic starting materials may be used to generate stereodefined acyclic products, which would be difficult to access by other methods.

(9)

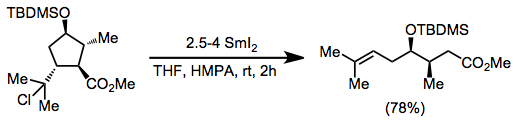

Samarium(II) iodide may be used to reduce ketones and aldehydes to alcohols; however, diastereoselectivity is low and a variety of more stereoselective methods exist. Aldehydes may be selectively reduced in the presence of ketones.

(10)

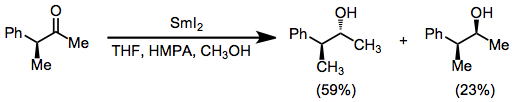

α-Functionalized carbonyl compounds are reduced to afford the corresponding carbonyl compounds. A number of functional groups can be replaced with hydrogen using this method; one transformation that is relatively unique to samarium(II) iodide is the reduction of α-hydroxy ketones and α-hydroxy lactones. In general, α,β-diheterosubstituted lactones may eliminate to give unsaturated lactones upon reaction with SmI_{2}, although the use of ethylene glycol as a proton donor minimizes this process

(11)

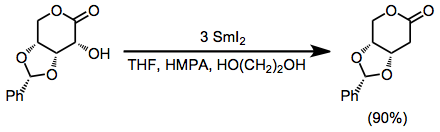

Some nitrogen-containing functional groups, most notably nitro groups, are reduced by samarium(II) iodide to the corresponding hydroxylamines or amines. Nitro compounds may be selectively reduced to either product, depending on the reaction conditions and time.

(12)

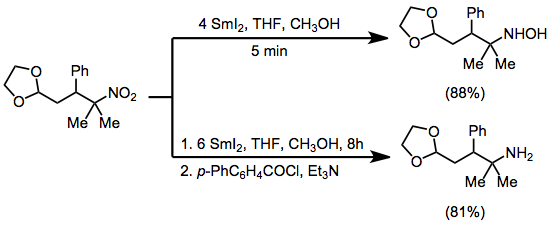

== Comparison with other methods ==
Samarium(II) iodide is effective for the reduction of a wide array of functional groups; however, other reducing agents are more useful in certain contexts. SmI_{2} causes reductive dimerization of allylic or benzylic halides, and chiral halides undergo non-stereospecific reduction. On the other hand, its functional group compatibility is greater than many reducing agents—halide reduction is possible in the presence of esters or alcohols. Reductive fragmentations with samarium(II) iodide have the disadvantage that they are not stereospecific; however, stereoselectivity is higher in some cases when SmI_{2} is used in place of other reducing agents. Reduction of α,β-unsaturated carboxylic acids and derivatives to the corresponding saturated carbonyl compounds by SmI_{2} is a useful transformation mediated by few other reducing agents. The mild reaction conditions employed for samarium(II) iodide reductions represent a significant advantage of the reaction over other single-electron reductions, including dissolving metal reduction and transition-metal induced methods.

== Experimental conditions ==
=== Typical conditions ===
Samarium(II) iodide is conveniently generated in the reaction of samarium metal with either diiodomethane or diiodoethane. The use of diiodomethane is convenient because the oxidant is a liquid (diiodoethane is a solid). Although pure SmI_{2} is air sensitive, solutions of the reagent may be manipulated in air without special precautions. SmI_{2} reacts very slowly with water and even more slowly with alcohols. Alcohols are commonly used as co-solvents or proton sources in SmI_{2} reductions, as immediate quenching of negatively charged intermediates with a proton source has proven beneficial for reaction yields. Importantly, because SmI_{2} is a one-electron reductant, multiple equivalents must be used to accomplish two-electron reductions of organic substrates. In most cases, a stoichiometric amount of the reagent or slight excess is sufficient.

The polarity of the solvent has a profound effect on the course of SmI_{2} reductions. Increasing the polarity of the reaction medium generally makes SmI_{2} a stronger reducing agent. HMPA may be used for this purpose; however, HMPA is a known carcinogen and should be handled with extreme care.

Workup procedures may vary depending on the stability of the products. If the organic products of the reaction are stable to aqueous acid, aqueous hydrochloric acid may be used to quench the reaction. For workups involving acid-labile products, mildly basic solutions or pH 7–8 buffers may be used. Samarium salts are usually insoluble in these conditions, but do form a suspension in the aqueous phase from which the desired organic product can be extracted.
