= Fire loading =

Fire loading in a building or compartment measures the potential severity of a hypothetical future fire. It represents the heat output per unit floor area, typically expressed in kJ/m², calculated based on the calorific value of the materials present. Fire loading is essential for evaluating industrial safety risks.

An empty room with a cement floor and ceiling, cinderblock walls, and no flammable materials would have almost zero fire loading. Any fire entering such a room would find nothing to fuel it. However, items that make a room functional (like furniture, electrical appliances, or computer equipment) or attractive (like wood panelling, acoustic tiles, carpeting, curtains, or wall decorations) increase the fire loading.

Certain uses naturally have high fire loading. For example, an art gallery and studio likely contains large amounts of canvas, paints, solvents, and wooden framing. Similarly, buildings under construction or renovation often have high fire loads due to construction materials, solvents, and fuel for generators.

Determining fire loading is crucial for planning safety measures, such as ensuring adequate fire detection and evacuation routes or installing fire sprinkler systems and other fire suppression systems.
