= Paint thinner =

Solvent used to dissolve paint

A paint thinner is a solvent used to thin (i.e. make it less thick) paints or varnish. Paint thinners are diluents. Solvents labeled "paint thinner" are usually white or mineral spirits.

Certain organic solvents used as paint thinners on painting materials can be harmful in of themselves, as well as through the release of hazard substances, including lead and other additives from dissolved paint stuffs.

== Uses ==
Principally, paints are either a colloidal suspension of solid pigment particles or are an emulsion of dense viscous dye gel or paste with a filler all dispersed through a lighter free-flowing liquid medium — the solvent. This solvent also controls flow and application properties, and in some cases can affect the stability of the paint while in liquid state. Its main function is to act as the carrier to ensure an even spread of the non-volatile components. After a long period in storage, the dense paint pigment and filler settles out over time and it can lose some of its solvent due to evaporation, becoming so thick and viscous that it does not flow properly when used. By the addition of more solvent, it can be diluted or re-dissolved to restore the paint to an appropriate consistency for use. The diluent acts to reduce the viscosity and so making a more free-flowing liquid.

These solvents can also be used as paint-brush cleaners to remove or to clean items that have become caked in dried-on paint. For certain kind of paints, improvements in paint manufacturing have led to the reduction of use of organic solvents in preference for water, means that paint clean-up can be done with water and common surfactants and detergents.

== Common paint thinners ==
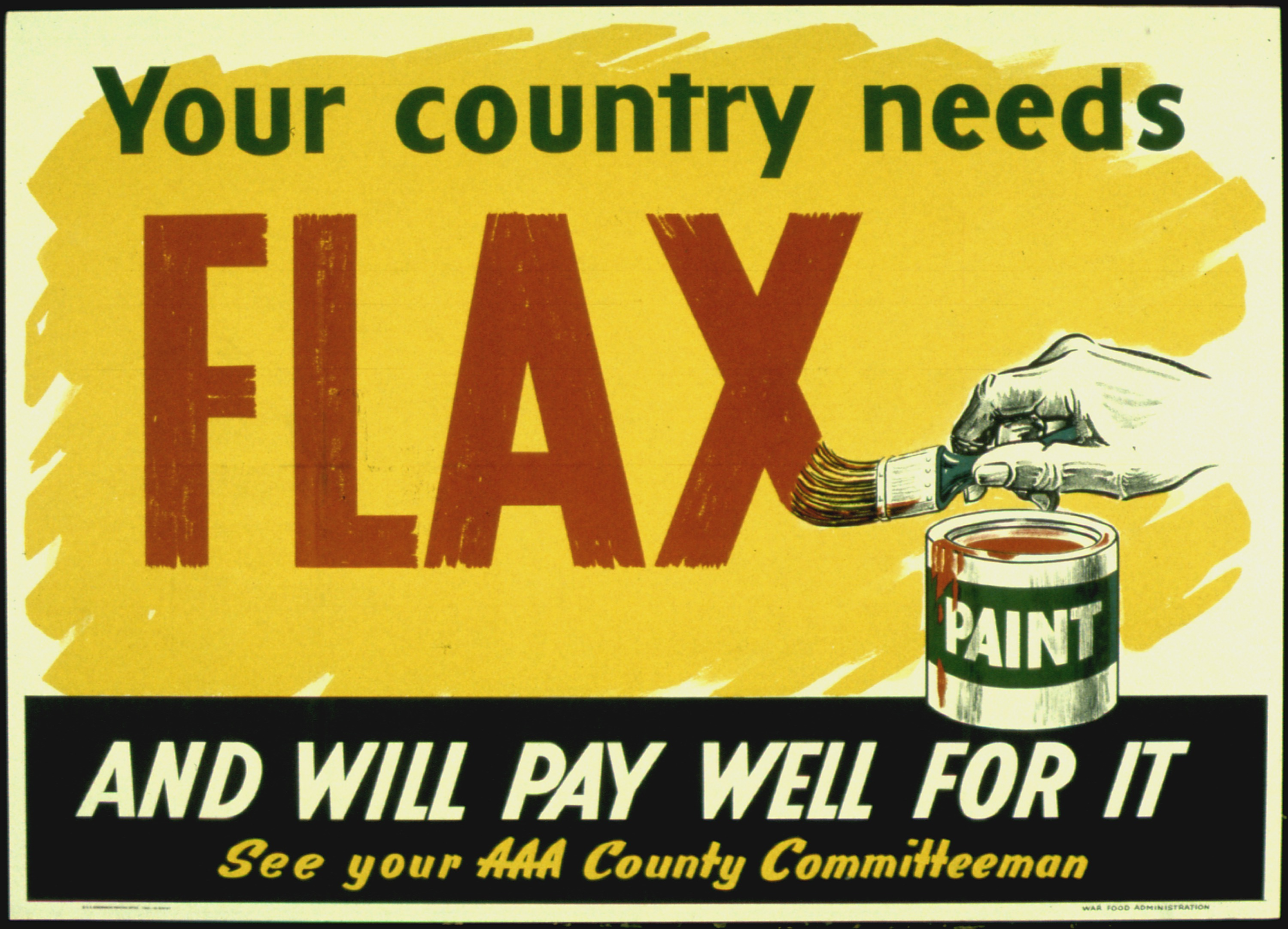
"Your country needs flax .." US World War II poster soliciting the public for linseed oil for use in paint.

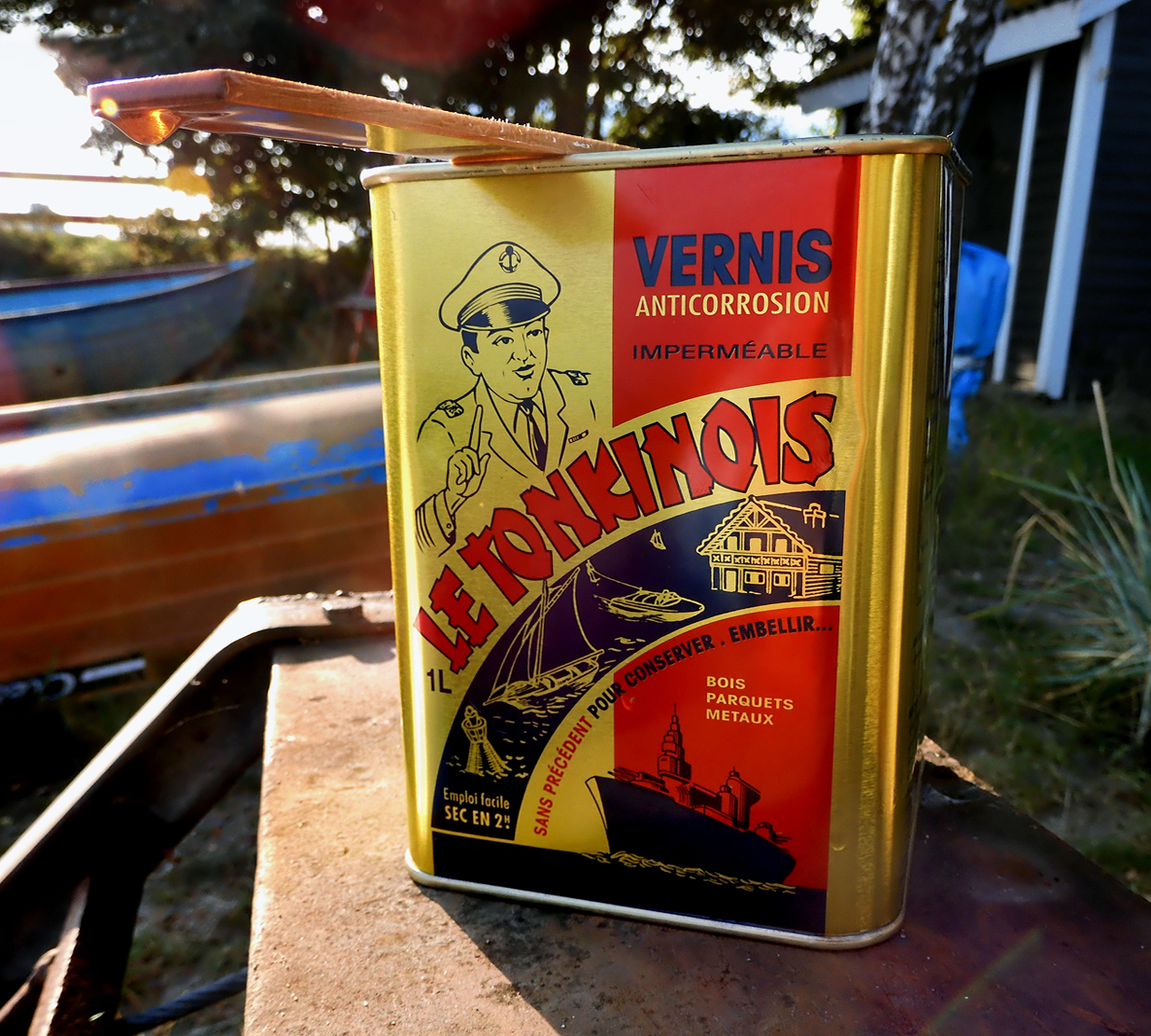
A can of French linseed oil — it is used as a carrier in media like oil paint and varnish making them more fluid, glossy, and transparent.

Common organic solvents used historically as paint thinners are volatile organic compounds — forms of hydrocarbons — and include:

- White spirit — also called mineral spirits
- Acetone — a very simple ketone, often called nail varnish remover
- Butanone / methyl ethyl ketone (MEK)
- Dimethylformamide (DMF)
- Glycol ethers — such as 2-Butoxyethanol
- Alcohols — such as isopropyl alcohol / isopropanol and 1-propanol
- Light naphtha distillates
- Turpentine
- Linseed oil
- Lacquer thinner — a combination of alcohols, alkyl esters, ethers, ketones, and aromatic hydrocarbons / arenes

Less common organic solvents used as paint thinner — like aromatic organic compounds that are more hazardous, so more heavily regulated and restricted in use — but still used in the construction industry include:

- Aromatic hydrocarbons / arenes
  - Ethylbenzene
  - Toluene / toluol
  - Xylene / xylol
- Alkyl esters
  - Amyl acetate
  - n-Butyl acetate
- Butanol

Inorganic solvents used as paint thinner:

- Water — the universal solvent is a paint thinner, technically, but rarely called so

== Hazards and health concerns ==
These organic solvents are volatile organic compounds (VOCs) and some paint thinners can ignite from just a small spark in relatively low temperatures, with white or mineral spirits having a very low flash point at about 40°C (104°F), the same as some popular brands of charcoal starter. All such solvents with low flash points are hazardous and must be labelled as flammable.

Prolonged exposure to VOCs emitted by paint containing these solvents or its clean-up using paint thinner are hazardous to health. VOCs exhibit high lipid solubility and for this reason, they bioaccumulate in adipose / fatty tissues. Extensive exposure to these vapours has been strongly related to organic solvent syndrome, although a definitive relation has yet to be fully established. For safety reasons, the use of substances containing these solvents should always be done in well-ventilated areas, to limit the health consequences and minimise the risk of injuries or fatalities. In countries with poor environmental protection regulation, workers commonly experience a high exposure to these chemicals with consequent damage to their health.

The American Conference of Governmental Industrial Hygienists has established threshold limit values (TLVs) for most of these compounds. The TLV is defined as the maximum concentration in air which can be breathed by a normal person — i.e. excluding children, pregnant women, etc. — in the course of a typical American work week of 40 hours, day-after-day through their work life without long-term ill effects. Globally, the most widely accepted standard for acceptable levels of VOC in paint is Green Seal's GS-11 Standards from the US which defines different VOC levels acceptable for different types of paint based on use case and performance requirements.

Disposal of organic solvents used as paint thinners have been regulated across the European Union and in most developed countries to restrict this and making illegal the deliberate or accidental release into wastewater via the sewage system, forbidding pouring these down the drain. It is possible to recycle these solvents and the paint through specific recovery mechanisms available at waste management and recycling centers. Due to their hazardous nature and environmental threat of damaging pollution — persistent organic pollutants from aromatic organic compounds that are resistant to degradation are often found in wastewater with poor handling and disposal resulting in them seeping into groundwater, contaminating public water supplies — so in recent decades, laws from legislatures like the European Parliament in EU regulations have extensively reduced the usage of these VOC solvents in favour of water-based paints — that is, using ones like acrylic paints that have been reformulated to be made with water as the primary solvent, with only low levels of hydrocarbon solvents, if any — which perform in a very similar way as oil paints, but also are much less polluting, so have a much lower environmental impact.

=== Addiction ===
Paint thinners are often used as an inhalant, due to its accessibility and legality as a drug. Many teenagers become addicted to thinner and due to lack of knowledge, parents and caregivers do not notice it or give it much attention. By using paint thinner a person could experience hallucinations, sensitive hearing (for the first time), speech deformation, memory loss, etc.

== See also ==
- Lacquer thinner – Solvents able to dissolve lacquer
- Environmental impact of paint
- Persistent organic pollutant – Organic compounds that are resistant to environmental degradation
- Substance-induced psychosis – Mental condition attributed to substance intoxication
