= Hansen solubility parameter =

Concept in chemistry

Hansen solubility parameters were developed by Charles M. Hansen in his Ph.D thesis in 1967 as a way of predicting if one material will dissolve in another and form a solution. They are based on the idea that like dissolves like where one molecule is defined as being 'like' another if it bonds to itself in a similar way.

Specifically, each molecule is given three Hansen parameters, each generally measured in MPa^{0.5}:

- $\ \delta_\text{d}$ The energy from dispersion forces between molecules
- $\ \delta_\text{p}$ The energy from dipolar intermolecular forces between molecules
- $\ \delta_\text{h}$ The energy from hydrogen bonds between molecules.

These three parameters can be treated as co-ordinates for a point in three dimensions also known as the Hansen space. The nearer two molecules are in this three-dimensional space, the more likely they are to dissolve into each other. To determine if the parameters of two molecules (usually a solvent and a polymer) are within range, a value called interaction radius ($R_\mathrm{0}$) is given to the substance being dissolved. This value determines the radius of the sphere in Hansen space and its center is the three Hansen parameters. To calculate the distance ($\ Ra$) between Hansen parameters in Hansen space the following formula is used:

$$\ (Ra)^2=4(\delta_{d2}-\delta_{d1})^2+(\delta_{p2}-\delta_{p1})^2+(\delta_{h2}-\delta_{h1})^2$$

Combining this with the interaction radius $R_\mathrm{0}$ gives the relative energy difference (RED) of the system:

$$\ RED=\textstyle\frac{Ra}{R_{0}}$$

- If $\ RED < 1$ the molecules are alike and will dissolve
- If $\ RED = 1$ the system will partially dissolve
- If $\ RED > 1$ the system will not dissolve

== Uses ==
Historically Hansen solubility parameters (HSP) have been used in industries such as paints and coatings where understanding and controlling solvent–polymer interactions was vital. Over the years their use has been extended widely to applications such as:

- Environmental stress cracking of polymers
- Controlled dispersion of pigments, such as carbon black
- Understanding of solubility/dispersion properties of carbon nanotubes, Buckyballs, and quantum dots
- Adhesion to polymers
- Permeation of solvents and chemicals through plastics to understand issues such as glove safety, food packaging barrier properties and skin permeation
- Diffusion of solvents into polymers via understanding of surface concentration based on RED number
- Cytotoxicity via interaction with DNA
- Artificial noses (where response depends on polymer solubility of the test odor)
- Safer, cheaper, and faster solvent blends where an undesirable solvent can be rationally replaced by a mix of more desirable solvents whose combined HSP equals the HSP of the original solvent.

== Theoretical context ==
HSP have been criticized for lacking the formal theoretical derivation of Hildebrand solubility parameters. All practical correlations of phase equilibrium involve certain assumptions that may or may not apply to a given system. In particular, all solubility parameter-based theories have a fundamental limitation that they apply only to associated solutions (i.e., they can only predict positive deviations from Raoult's law): they cannot account for negative deviations from Raoult's law that result from effects such as solvation (often important in water-soluble polymers) or the formation of electron donor acceptor complexes. Like any simple predictive theory, HSP are best used for screening with data used to validate the predictions. Hansen parameters have been used to estimate Flory-Huggins Chi parameters, often with reasonable accuracy.

The factor of 4 in front of the dispersion term in the calculation of Ra has been the subject of debate. There is some theoretical basis for the factor of four (see Ch 2 of Ref 1 and also. However, there are clearly systems (e.g. Bottino et al., "Solubility parameters of poly(vinylidene fluoride)" J. Polym. Sci. Part B: Polymer Physics 26(4), 785-79, 1988) where the regions of solubility are far more eccentric than predicted by the standard Hansen theory.

HSP effects can be over-ridden by size effects (large molecules can give rise to "anomalous diffusion").

It has been shown that it is possible to calculate HSP via molecular dynamics techniques, though currently the polar and hydrogen bonding parameters cannot reliably be partitioned in a manner that is compatible with Hansen's values.

== Limitations ==
The following are limitations according to Hansen:

- The parameters will vary with temperature
- The parameters are an approximation. Bonding between molecules is more subtle than the three parameters suggest. Molecular shape is relevant, as are other types of bonding such as induced dipole, metallic and electrostatic interactions.
- The size of the molecules also plays a significant role in whether two molecules actually dissolve in a given period.
- The parameters are hard to measure.
- 2008 work by Abbott and Hansen has helped address some of the above issues. Temperature variations can be calculated, the role of molar volume ("kinetics versus thermodynamics") is clarified, new chromatographic ways to measure HSP are available, large datasets for chemicals and polymers are available, 'Sphere' software for determining HSP values of polymers, inks, quantum dots etc. is available (or easy to implement in one's own software) and the new Stefanis-Panayiotou method for estimating HSP from Unifac groups is available in the literature and also automated in software. All these new capabilities are described in the e-book, software, datasets described in the external links but can be implemented independently of any commercial package.
- Sometimes Hildebrand solubility parameters are used for similar purposes. Hildebrand parameters are not suitable for use outside their original area which was non-polar, non-hydrogen-bonding solvents. The Hildebrand parameter for such non-polar solvents is usually close to the Hansen $\ \delta_{d}$ value. A typical example showing why Hildebrand parameters can be unhelpful is that two solvents, butanol and nitroethane, which have the same Hildebrand parameter, are each incapable of dissolving typical epoxy polymers. Yet a 50:50 mix gives a good solvency for epoxies. This is easily explainable knowing the Hansen parameter of the two solvents and that the Hansen parameter for the 50:50 mix is close to the Hansen parameter of epoxies.

== See also ==
- Solvent (has a chart of Hansen solubility parameters for various solvents)
- Hildebrand solubility parameter
- MOSCED
