= Hildebrand solubility parameter =

Type of parameter

The Hildebrand solubility parameter (δ) provides a numerical estimate of the degree of interaction between materials and can be a good indication of solubility, particularly for nonpolar materials such as many polymers. Materials with similar values of δ are likely to be miscible.

== Definition ==
The Hildebrand solubility parameter is the square root of the cohesive energy density:

$$\delta = \sqrt{\frac{\Delta H_v - RT}{V_m}}.$$

The cohesive energy density is the amount of energy needed to completely remove a unit volume of molecules from their neighbours to infinite separation (an ideal gas). This is equal to the heat of vaporization of the compound divided by its molar volume in the condensed phase. In order for a material to dissolve, these same interactions need to be overcome, as the molecules are separated from each other and surrounded by the solvent. In 1936 Joel Henry Hildebrand suggested the square root of the cohesive energy density as a numerical value indicating solvency behavior. This later became known as the "Hildebrand solubility parameter". Materials with similar solubility parameters will be able to interact with each other, resulting in solvation, miscibility or swelling.

== Uses and limitations ==
Its principal utility is that it provides simple predictions of phase equilibrium based on a single parameter that is readily obtained for most materials. These predictions are often useful for nonpolar and slightly polar (dipole moment < 2 debyes) systems without hydrogen bonding. It has found particular use in predicting solubility and swelling of polymers by solvents. More complicated three-dimensional solubility parameters, such as Hansen solubility parameters, have been proposed for polar molecules.

The principal limitation of the solubility parameter approach is that it applies only to associated solutions ("like dissolves like" or, technically speaking, positive deviations from Raoult's law); it cannot account for negative deviations from Raoult's law that result from effects such as solvation or the formation of electron donor–acceptor complexes. Like any simple predictive theory, it can inspire overconfidence; it is best used for screening with data used to verify the predictions.

== Units ==
The conventional units for the solubility parameter are (calories per cm^{3})^{1/2}, or cal^{1/2} cm^{−3/2}. The SI units are J^{1/2} m^{−3/2}, equivalent to the pascal^{1/2}. 1 calorie is equal to 4.184 J.

1 cal^{1/2} cm^{−3/2} = (523/125 J)^{1/2} (10^{−2} m)^{−3/2} = (4.184 J)^{1/2} (0.01 m)^{−3/2} = 2.045483 10^{3} J^{1/2} m^{−3/2} = 2.045483 (10^{6} J/m^{3})^{1/2}= 2.045483 MPa^{1/2}.

Given the non-exact nature of the use of δ, it is often sufficient to say that the number in MPa^{1/2} is about twice the number in cal^{1/2} cm^{−3/2}. Where the units are not given, for example, in older books, it is usually safe to assume the non-SI unit.

== Examples ==
Substance	δ [cal^{1/2} cm^{−3/2}]	δ [MPa^{1/2}]
n-Pentane	7.0	14.4
n-hexane	7.24	14.9
Diethyl Ether	7.62	15.4
Ethyl Acetate	9.1	18.2
Chloroform	9.21	18.7
Dichloromethane	9.93	20.2
Acetone	9.77	19.9
2-propanol	11.6	23.8
Ethanol	12.92	26.5
PTFE	6.2	
Poly(ethylene)	7.9	
Poly(propylene)	8.2	16.6
Poly(styrene)	9.13	
Poly(phenylene oxide)	9.15	
PVC	9.5	19.5
Polyurethane (PU/PUR)	8.9	
PET	10.1	20.5
Nylon 6,6	13.7	28
Poly(methyl methacrylate)	9.3	19.0
(Hydroxyethyl)methacrylate		25–26
poly(HEMA)		26.93
Ethylene glycol		29.9, 33.0

From the table, poly(ethylene) has a solubility parameter of 7.9 cal^{1/2} cm^{−3/2}. Good solvents are likely to be diethyl ether and hexane. (However, PE only dissolves at temperatures well above 100 °C.) Poly(styrene) has a solubility parameter of 9.1 cal^{1/2} cm^{−3/2}, and thus ethyl acetate is likely to be a good solvent. Nylon 6,6 has a solubility parameter of 13.7 cal^{1/2} cm^{−3/2}, and ethanol is likely to be the best solvent of those tabulated. However, the latter is polar, and thus we should be very cautions about using just the Hildebrand solubility parameter to make predictions.

== See also ==
- Solvent
- Hansen solubility parameters
