= Solvent =

Substance dissolving a solute resulting in a solution

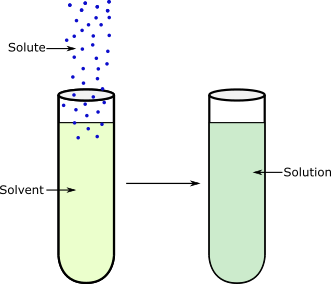
A solvent dissolves a solute, resulting in a solution

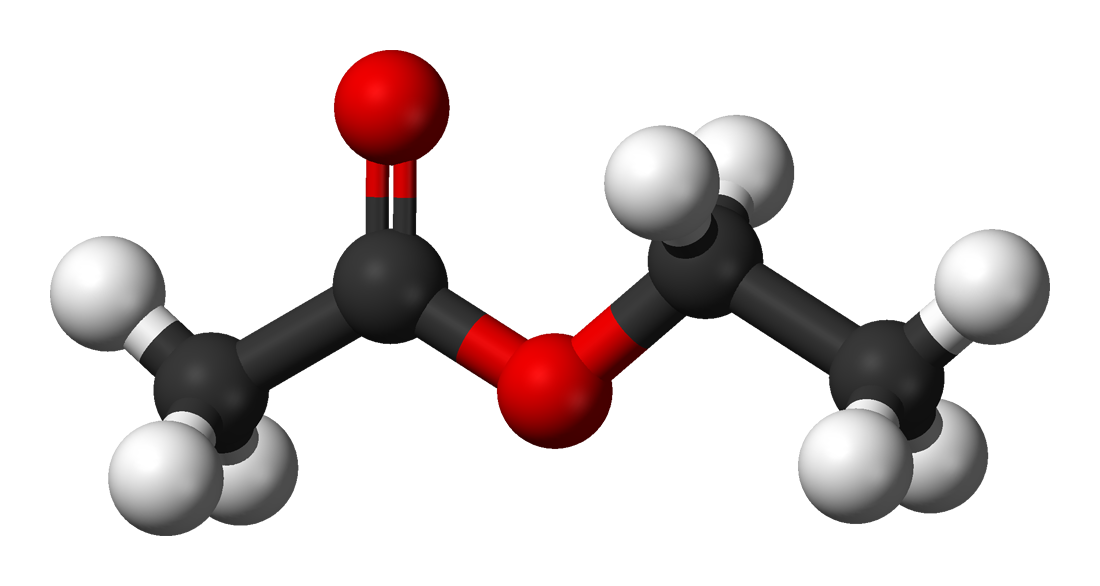
Ethyl acetate, a nail polish solvent.

A solvent (from the Latin solvō, "loosen, untie, solve") is a substance that dissolves a solute, resulting in a solution. A solvent is usually a liquid but can also be a solid, a gas, or a supercritical fluid. Water is a solvent for polar molecules, and the most common solvent used by living things; all the ions and proteins in a cell are dissolved in water within the cell.

Major uses of solvents are in paints, paint removers, inks, and dry cleaning. Specific uses for organic solvents are in dry cleaning (e.g. tetrachloroethylene); as paint thinners (toluene, turpentine); as nail polish removers and solvents of glue (acetone, methyl acetate, ethyl acetate); in spot removers (hexane, petrol ether); in detergents (citrus terpenes); and in perfumes (ethanol). Solvents find various applications in chemical, pharmaceutical, oil, and gas industries, including in chemical syntheses and purification processes.

Some petrochemical solvents are highly toxic and emit volatile organic compounds. Biobased solvents are usually more expensive, but ideally less toxic and biodegradable. Biogenic raw materials usable for solvent production are for example lignocellulose, starch and sucrose, but also waste and byproducts from other industries (such as terpenes, vegetable oils and animal fats).

== Solutions and solvation ==
When one substance is dissolved into another, a solution is formed. This is opposed to the situation when the compounds are insoluble like sand in water. In a solution, all of the ingredients are uniformly distributed at a molecular level and no residue remains. A solvent-solute mixture consists of a single phase with all solute molecules occurring as solvates (solvent-solute complexes), as opposed to separate continuous phases as in suspensions, emulsions and other types of non-solution mixtures. The ability of one compound to be dissolved in another is known as solubility; if this occurs in all proportions, it is called miscible.

In addition to mixing, the substances in a solution interact with each other at the molecular level. When something is dissolved, molecules of the solvent arrange around molecules of the solute. Heat transfer is involved and entropy is increased making the solution more thermodynamically stable than the solute and solvent separately. This arrangement is mediated by the respective chemical properties of the solvent and solute, such as hydrogen bonding, dipole moment and polarizability. Solvation does not cause a chemical reaction or chemical configuration changes in the solute. However, solvation resembles a coordination complex formation reaction, often with considerable energetics (heat of solvation and entropy of solvation) and is thus far from a neutral process.

When one substance dissolves into another, a solution is formed. A solution is a homogeneous mixture consisting of a solute dissolved into a solvent. The solute is the substance that is being dissolved, while the solvent is the dissolving medium. Solutions can be formed with many different types and forms of solutes and solvents.

== Solvent classifications ==
Solvents can be broadly classified into two categories: polar and non-polar. A special case is elemental mercury, whose solutions are known as amalgams; also, other metal solutions exist which are liquid at room temperature.

Generally, the dielectric constant of the solvent provides a rough measure of a solvent's polarity. The strong polarity of water is indicated by its high dielectric constant of 88 (at 0 °C). Solvents with a dielectric constant of less than 15 are generally considered to be nonpolar.

The dielectric constant measures the solvent's tendency to partly cancel the field strength of the electric field of a charged particle immersed in it. This reduction is then compared to the field strength of the charged particle in a vacuum. Heuristically, the dielectric constant of a solvent can be thought of as its ability to reduce the solute's effective internal charge. Generally, the dielectric constant of a solvent is an acceptable predictor of the solvent's ability to dissolve common ionic compounds, such as salts.

=== Other polarity scales ===
Dielectric constants are not the only measure of polarity. Because solvents are used by chemists to carry out chemical reactions or observe chemical and biological phenomena, more specific measures of polarity are required. Most of these measures are sensitive to chemical structure.

The Grunwald–Winstein mY scale measures polarity in terms of solvent influence on buildup of positive charge of a solute during a chemical reaction.

Kosower's Z scale measures polarity in terms of the influence of the solvent on UV-absorption maxima of a salt, usually pyridinium iodide or the pyridinium zwitterion.

Donor number and donor acceptor scale measures polarity in terms of how a solvent interacts with specific substances, like a strong Lewis acid or a strong Lewis base.

The Hildebrand parameter is the square root of cohesive energy density. It can be used with nonpolar compounds, but cannot accommodate complex chemistry.

Reichardt's dye, a solvatochromic dye that changes color in response to polarity, gives a scale of E_{T}(30) values. E_{T} is the transition energy between the ground state and the lowest excited state in kcal/mol, and (30) identifies the dye. Another, roughly correlated scale (E_{T}(33)) can be defined with Nile red.

Gregory's solvent ϸ parameter is a quantum chemically derived charge density parameter. This parameter seems to reproduce many of the experimental solvent parameters (especially the donor and acceptor numbers) using this charge decomposition analysis approach, with an electrostatic basis. The ϸ parameter was originally developed to quantify and explain the Hofmeister series by quantifying polyatomic ions and the monatomic ions in a united manner.

The polarity, dipole moment, polarizability and hydrogen bonding of a solvent determines what type of compounds it is able to dissolve and with what other solvents or liquid compounds it is miscible. Generally, polar solvents dissolve polar compounds best and non-polar solvents dissolve non-polar compounds best; hence "like dissolves like". Strongly polar compounds like sugars (e.g. sucrose) or ionic compounds, like inorganic salts (e.g. table salt) dissolve only in very polar solvents like water, while strongly non-polar compounds like oils or waxes dissolve only in very non-polar organic solvents like hexane. Similarly, water and hexane (or vinegar and vegetable oil) are not miscible with each other and will quickly separate into two layers even after being shaken well.

Polarity can be separated to different contributions. For example, the Kamlet-Taft parameters are dipolarity/polarizability (π*), hydrogen-bonding acidity (α) and hydrogen-bonding basicity (β). These can be calculated from the wavelength shifts of 3–6 different solvatochromic dyes in the solvent, usually including Reichardt's dye, nitroaniline and diethylnitroaniline. Another option, Hansen solubility parameters, separates the cohesive energy density into dispersion, polar, and hydrogen bonding contributions.

=== Polar protic and polar aprotic ===
Solvents with a dielectric constant (more accurately, relative static permittivity) greater than 15 (i.e. polar or polarizable) can be further divided into protic and aprotic. Protic solvents, such as water, solvate anions (negatively charged solutes) strongly via hydrogen bonding. Polar aprotic solvents, such as acetone or dichloromethane, tend to have large dipole moments (separation of partial positive and partial negative charges within the same molecule) and solvate positively charged species via their negative dipole. In chemical reactions the use of polar protic solvents favors the S_{N}1 reaction mechanism, while polar aprotic solvents favor the S_{N}2 reaction mechanism. These polar solvents are capable of forming hydrogen bonds with water to dissolve in water whereas non-polar solvents are not capable of strong hydrogen bonds.

== Physical properties ==
=== Properties table of common solvents ===
The solvents are grouped into nonpolar, polar aprotic, and polar protic solvents, with each group ordered by increasing polarity. The properties of solvents which exceed those of water are bolded.

Solvent	Chemical formula	Boiling point (°C)	Dielectric constant	Density (g/mL)	Dipole moment (D)
==== Nonpolar hydrocarbon solvents ====
Pentane	CH_{3}CH_{2}CH_{2}CH_{2}CH_{3}	36.1	1.84	0.626	0.00
Hexane	CH_{3}CH_{2}CH_{2}CH_{2}CH_{2}CH_{3}	69	1.88	0.655	0.00
Benzene	C_{6}H_{6}	80.1	2.3	0.879	0.00
Heptane	H_{3}C(CH_{2})_{5}CH_{3}	98.38	1.92	0.680	0.0
Toluene	C_{6}H_{5}-CH_{3}	**111**	2.38	0.867	0.36
==== Nonpolar ether solvents ====
1,4-Dioxane	C_{4}H_{8}O_{2}	**101.1**	2.3	**1.033**	0.45
Diethyl ether	CH_{3}CH_{2}-O-CH_{2}CH_{3}	34.6	4.3	0.713	1.15
Tetrahydrofuran (THF)	C_{4}H_{8}O	66	7.5	0.886	1.75
==== Nonpolar chlorocarbon solvents ====
Chloroform	CHCl_{3}	61.2	4.81	**1.498**	1.04
==== Polar aprotic solvents ====
Dichloromethane (DCM)	CH_{2}Cl_{2}	39.6	9.1	**1.3266**	1.60
Ethyl acetate	CH_{3}-C(=O)-O-CH_{2}-CH_{3}	77.1	6.02	0.894	1.78
Acetone	CH_{3}-C(=O)-CH_{3}	56.1	21	0.786	**2.88**
Dimethylformamide (DMF)	H-C(=O)N(CH_{3})_{2}	**153**	38	0.944	**3.82**
Acetonitrile (MeCN)	CH_{3}-C≡N	82	37.5	0.786	**3.92**
Dimethyl sulfoxide (DMSO)	CH_{3}-S(=O)-CH_{3}	**189**	46.7	**1.092**	**3.96**
Nitromethane	CH_{3}-NO_{2}	**100–103**	35.87	**1.1371**	**3.56**
Propylene carbonate	C_{4}H_{6}O_{3}	**240**	64.0	**1.205**	**4.9**
==== Polar protic solvents ====
Ammonia	NH_{3}	-33.3	17	0.674 (at −33.3 °C)	1.42
Formic acid	H-C(=O)OH	**100.8**	58	**1.21**	1.41
n-Butanol	CH_{3}CH_{2}CH_{2}CH_{2}OH	**117.7**	18	0.810	1.63
Isopropyl alcohol (IPA)	CH_{3}-CH(-OH)-CH_{3}	82.6	18	0.785	1.66
n-Propanol	CH_{3}CH_{2}CH_{2}OH	97	20	0.803	1.68
Ethanol	CH_{3}CH_{2}OH	78.2	24.55	0.789	1.69
Methanol	CH_{3}OH	64.7	33	0.791	1.70
Acetic acid	CH_{3}-C(=O)OH	**118**	6.2	**1.049**	1.74
Water	H-O-H	100	80	1.000	1.85

The ACS Green Chemistry Institute maintains a tool for the selection of solvents based on a principal component analysis of solvent properties.

=== Hansen solubility parameter values ===
The Hansen solubility parameter (HSP) values are based on dispersion bonds (δD), polar bonds (δP) and hydrogen bonds (δH). These contain information about the inter-molecular interactions with other solvents and also with polymers, pigments, nanoparticles, etc. This allows for rational formulations knowing, for example, that there is a good HSP match between a solvent and a polymer. Rational substitutions can also be made for "good" solvents (effective at dissolving the solute) that are "bad" (expensive or hazardous to health or the environment). The following table shows that the intuitions from "non-polar", "polar aprotic" and "polar protic" are put numerically – the "polar" molecules have higher levels of δP and the protic solvents have higher levels of δH. Because numerical values are used, comparisons can be made rationally by comparing numbers. For example, acetonitrile is much more polar than acetone but exhibits slightly less hydrogen bonding.

Solvent	Chemical formula	δD Dispersion	δP Polar	δH Hydrogen bonding
==== Non-polar solvents ====
n-Pentane	CH_{3}-(CH_{2})_{3}-CH_{3}	14.5	0.0	0.0
n-Hexane	CH_{3}-(CH_{2})_{4}-CH_{3}	14.9	0.0	0.0
n-Heptane	CH_{3}-(CH_{2})_{5}-CH_{3}	15.3	0.0	0.0
Cyclohexane	/-(CH_{2})_{6}-\	16.8	0.0	0.2
Benzene	C_{6}H_{6}	18.4	0.0	2.0
Toluene	C_{6}H_{5}-CH_{3}	18.0	1.4	2.0
Diethyl ether	C_{2}H_{5}-O-C_{2}H_{5}	14.5	2.9	4.6
Chloroform	CHCl_{3}	17.8	3.1	5.7
1,4-Dioxane	/-(CH_{2})_{2}O(CH_{2})_{2}O-\	17.5	1.8	9.0
==== Polar aprotic solvents ====
Ethyl acetate	CH_{3}-C(=O)-O-C_{2}H_{5}	15.8	5.3	7.2
Tetrahydrofuran	/-(CH_{2})_{4}-O-\	16.8	5.7	8.0
Dichloromethane	CH_{2}Cl_{2}	17.0	7.3	7.1
Acetone	CH_{3}-C(=O)-CH_{3}	15.5	10.4	7.0
Acetonitrile	CH_{3}-C≡N	15.3	18.0	6.1
Dimethylformamide	H-C(=O)-N(CH_{3})_{2}	17.4	13.7	11.3
Dimethylacetamide	CH_{3}-C(=O)-N(CH_{3})_{2}	16.8	11.5	10.2
Dimethylimidazolidinone	C_{5}H_{10}N_{2}O	18.0	10.5	9.7
Dimethylpropyleneurea	C_{6}H_{12}N_{2}O	17.8	9.5	9.3
N-Methylpyrrolidone	/-(CH_{2})_{3}-N(CH_{3})-C(=O)-\	18.0	12.3	7.2
Propylene carbonate	C_{4}H_{6}O_{3}	20.0	18.0	4.1
Pyridine	C_{5}H_{5}N	19.0	8.8	5.9
Sulfolane	/-(CH_{2})_{4}-S(=O)_{2}-\	19.2	16.2	9.4
Dimethyl sulfoxide	CH_{3}-S(=O)-CH_{3}	18.4	16.4	10.2
==== Polar protic solvents ====
Acetic acid	CH_{3}-C(=O)-OH	14.5	8.0	13.5
n-Butanol	CH_{3}-(CH_{2})_{3}-OH	16.0	5.7	15.8
Isopropanol	(CH_{3})_{2}-CH-OH	15.8	6.1	16.4
n-Propanol	CH_{3}-(CH_{2})_{2}-OH	16.0	6.8	17.4
Ethanol	C_{2}H_{5}-OH	15.8	8.8	19.4
Methanol	CH_{3}-OH	14.7	12.3	22.3
Ethylene glycol	HO-(CH_{2})_{2}-OH	17.0	11.0	26.0
Glycerol	HO-CH_{2}-CH(OH)-CH_{2}-OH	17.4	12.1	29.3
Formic acid	H-C(=O)-OH	14.6	10.0	14.0
Water	H-O-H	15.5	16.0	42.3

If, for environmental or other reasons, a solvent or solvent blend is required to replace another of equivalent solvency, the substitution can be made on the basis of the Hansen solubility parameters of each. The values for mixtures are taken as the weighted averages of the values for the neat solvents. This can be calculated by trial-and-error, a spreadsheet of values, or HSP software. A 1:1 mixture of toluene and 1,4 dioxane has δD, δP and δH values of 17.8, 1.6 and 5.5, comparable to those of chloroform at 17.8, 3.1 and 5.7 respectively. Because of the health hazards associated with toluene itself, other mixtures of solvents may be found using a full HSP dataset.

=== Boiling point ===
Solvent	Boiling point (°C)
ethylene dichloride	83.48
pyridine	115.25
methyl isobutyl ketone	116.5
methylene chloride	39.75
isooctane	99.24
carbon disulfide	46.3
carbon tetrachloride	76.75
o-xylene	144.42

The boiling point is an important property because it determines the speed of evaporation. Small amounts of low-boiling-point solvents like diethyl ether, dichloromethane, or acetone will evaporate in seconds at room temperature, while high-boiling-point solvents like water or dimethyl sulfoxide need higher temperatures, an air flow, or the application of vacuum for fast evaporation.

- Low boilers: boiling point below 100 °C (boiling point of water)
- Medium boilers: between 100 °C and 150 °C
- High boilers: above 150 °C

=== Density ===
Most organic solvents have a lower density than water, which means they are lighter than and will form a layer on top of water. Important exceptions are most of the halogenated solvents like dichloromethane or chloroform will sink to the bottom of a container, leaving water as the top layer. This is crucial to remember when partitioning compounds between solvents and water in a separatory funnel during chemical syntheses.

Often, specific gravity is cited in place of density. Specific gravity is defined as the density of the solvent divided by the density of water at the same temperature. As such, specific gravity is a unitless value. It readily communicates whether a water-insoluble solvent will float (SG < 1.0) or sink (SG > 1.0) when mixed with water.

Solvent	Specific gravity
Pentane	0.626
Petroleum ether	0.656
Hexane	0.659
Heptane	0.684
Diethyl amine	0.707
Diethyl ether	0.713
Triethyl amine	0.728
tert-Butyl methyl ether	0.741
Cyclohexane	0.779
tert-Butyl alcohol	0.781
Isopropanol	0.785
Acetonitrile	0.786
Ethanol	0.789
Acetone	0.790
Methanol	0.791
Methyl isobutyl ketone	0.798
Isobutyl alcohol	0.802
1-Propanol	0.803
Methyl ethyl ketone	0.805
2-Butanol	0.808
Isoamyl alcohol	0.809
1-Butanol	0.810
Diethyl ketone	0.814
1-Octanol	0.826
p-Xylene	0.861
m-Xylene	0.864
Toluene	0.867
Dimethoxyethane	0.868
Benzene	0.879
Butyl acetate	0.882
1-Chlorobutane	0.886
Tetrahydrofuran	0.889
Ethyl acetate	0.895
o-Xylene	0.897
Hexamethylphosphorus triamide	0.898
2-Ethoxyethyl ether	0.909
N,N-Dimethylacetamide	0.937
Diethylene glycol dimethyl ether	0.943
N,N-Dimethylformamide	0.944
2-Methoxyethanol	0.965
Pyridine	0.982
Propanoic acid	0.993
Water	1.000
2-Methoxyethyl acetate	1.009
Benzonitrile	1.01
1-Methyl-2-pyrrolidinone	1.028
Hexamethylphosphoramide	1.03
1,4-Dioxane	1.033
Acetic acid	1.049
Acetic anhydride	1.08
Dimethyl sulfoxide	1.092
Chlorobenzene	1.1066
Deuterium oxide	1.107
Ethylene glycol	1.115
Diethylene glycol	1.118
Propylene carbonate	1.21
Formic acid	1.22
1,2-Dichloroethane	1.245
Glycerin	1.261
Carbon disulfide	1.263
1,2-Dichlorobenzene	1.306
Methylene chloride	1.325
Nitromethane	1.382
2,2,2-Trifluoroethanol	1.393
Chloroform	1.498
1,1,2-Trichlorotrifluoroethane	1.575
Carbon tetrachloride	1.594
Tetrachloroethylene	1.623

== Multicomponent solvents ==
Multicomponent solvents appeared after World War II in the USSR, and continue to be used and produced in the post-Soviet states. These solvents may have one or more applications, but they are not universal preparations.

=== Solvents ===
Name	Composition
Solvent 645	toluene 50%, butyl acetate 18%, ethyl acetate 12%, butanol 10%, ethanol 10%.
Solvent 646	toluene 50%, ethanol 15%, butanol 10%, butyl- or amyl acetate 10%, ethyl cellosolve 8%, acetone 7%
Solvent 647	butyl- or amyl acetate 29.8%, ethyl acetate 21.2%, butanol 7.7%, toluene or benzopyrene 41.3%
Solvent 648	butyl acetate 50%, ethanol 10%, butanol 20%, toluene 20%
Solvent 649	ethyl cellosolve 30%, butanol 20%, xylene 50%
Solvent 650	ethyl cellosolve 20%, butanol 30%, xylene 50%
Solvent 651	white spirit 90%, butanol 10%
Solvent KR-36	butyl acetate 20%, butanol 80%
Solvent R-4	toluene 62%, acetone 26%, butyl acetate 12%.
Solvent R-10	xylene 85%, acetone 15%.
Solvent R-12	toluene 60%, butyl acetate 30%, xylene 10%.
Solvent R-14	cyclohexanone 50%, toluene 50%.
Solvent R-24	solvent 50%, xylene 35%, acetone 15%.
Solvent R-40	toluene 50%, ethyl cellosolve 30%, acetone 20%.
Solvent R-219	toluene 34%, cyclohexanone 33%, acetone 33%.
Solvent R-3160	butanol 60%, ethanol 40%.
Solvent RCC	xylene 90%, butyl acetate 10%.
Solvent RML	ethanol 64%, ethylcellosolve 16%, toluene 10%, butanol 10%.
Solvent PML-315	toluene 25%, xylene 25%, butyl acetate 18%, ethyl cellosolve 17%, butanol 15%.
Solvent PC-1	toluene 60%, butyl acetate 30%, xylene 10%.
Solvent PC-2	white spirit 70%, xylene 30%.
Solvent RFG	ethanol 75%, butanol 25%.
Solvent RE-1	xylene 50%, acetone 20%, butanol 15%, ethanol 15%.
Solvent RE-2	petroleum spirits 70%, ethanol 20%, acetone 10%.
Solvent RE-3	petroleum spirits 50%, ethanol 20%, acetone 20%, ethyl cellosolve 10%.
Solvent RE-4	petroleum spirits 50%, acetone 30%, ethanol 20%.
Solvent FK-1 (?)	absolute alcohol (99.8%) 95%, ethyl acetate 5%

=== Thinners ===
Name	Composition
Thinner RKB-1	butanol 50%, xylene 50%
Thinner RKB-2	butanol 95%, xylene 5%
Thinner RKB-3	xylene 90%, butanol 10%
Thinner M	ethanol 65%, butyl acetate 30%, ethyl acetate 5%.
Thinner P-7	cyclohexanone 50%, ethanol 50%.
Thinner R-197	xylene 60%, butyl acetate 20%, ethyl cellosolve 20%.
Thinner of WFD	toluene 50%, butyl acetate (or amyl acetate) 18%, butanol 10%, ethanol 10%, ethyl acetate 9%, acetone 3%.

== Safety ==
=== Fire ===
Most organic solvents are flammable or highly flammable, depending on their volatility. Exceptions are some chlorinated solvents like dichloromethane and chloroform. Mixtures of solvent vapors and air can explode. Solvent vapors are heavier than air; they will sink to the bottom and can travel large distances nearly undiluted. Solvent vapors can also be found in supposedly empty drums and cans, posing a flash fire hazard; hence empty containers of volatile solvents should be stored open and upside down.

Both diethyl ether and carbon disulfide have exceptionally low autoignition temperatures which increase greatly the fire risk associated with these solvents. The autoignition temperature of carbon disulfide is below 100 °C (212 °F), so objects such as steam pipes, light bulbs, hotplates, and recently extinguished bunsen burners are able to ignite its vapors.

In addition some solvents, such as methanol, can burn with a very hot flame which can be nearly invisible under some lighting conditions. This can delay or prevent the timely recognition of a dangerous fire, until flames spread to other materials.

=== Explosive peroxide formation ===
Ethers like diethyl ether and tetrahydrofuran (THF) can form highly explosive organic peroxides upon exposure to oxygen and light. THF is normally more likely to form such peroxides than diethyl ether. One of the most susceptible solvents is diisopropyl ether, but all ethers are considered to be potential peroxide sources.

The heteroatom (oxygen) stabilizes the formation of a free radical which is formed by the abstraction of a hydrogen atom by another free radical. The carbon-centered free radical thus formed is able to react with an oxygen molecule to form a peroxide compound. The process of peroxide formation is greatly accelerated by exposure to even low levels of light, but can proceed slowly even in dark conditions.

Unless a desiccant is used which can destroy the peroxides, they will concentrate during distillation, due to their higher boiling point. When sufficient peroxides have formed, they can form a crystalline, shock-sensitive solid precipitate at the mouth of a container or bottle. Minor mechanical disturbances, such as scraping the inside of a vessel, the dislodging of a deposit, or merely twisting the cap may provide sufficient energy for the peroxide to detonate or explode violently.

Peroxide formation is not a significant problem when fresh solvents are used up quickly; they are more of a problem in laboratories which may take years to finish a single bottle. Low-volume users should acquire only small amounts of peroxide-prone solvents, and dispose of old solvents on a regular periodic schedule.

To avoid explosive peroxide formation, ethers should be stored in an airtight container, away from light, because both light and air can encourage peroxide formation.

A number of tests can be used to detect the presence of a peroxide in an ether; one is to use a combination of iron(II) sulfate and potassium thiocyanate. The peroxide is able to oxidize the Fe^{2+} ion to an Fe^{3+} ion, which then forms a deep-red coordination complex with the thiocyanate.

Peroxides may be removed by washing with acidic iron(II) sulfate, filtering through alumina, or distilling from sodium/benzophenone. Alumina degrades the peroxides but some could remain intact in it, therefore it must be disposed of properly. The advantage of using sodium/benzophenone is that moisture and oxygen are removed as well.

== Health effects ==
General health hazards associated with solvent exposure include toxicity to the nervous system, reproductive damage, liver and kidney damage, respiratory impairment, cancer, hearing loss, and dermatitis.

=== Acute exposure ===
Many solvents can lead to a sudden loss of consciousness if inhaled in large amounts. Solvents like diethyl ether and chloroform have been used in medicine as anesthetics, sedatives, and hypnotics for a long time. Many solvents (e.g. from gasoline or solvent-based glues) are abused recreationally in glue sniffing, often with harmful long-term health effects such as neurotoxicity or cancer. Fraudulent substitution of 1,5-pentanediol by the psychoactive 1,4-butanediol by a subcontractor caused the Bindeez product recall.

Ethanol (grain alcohol) is a widely used and abused psychoactive drug. If ingested, the so-called "toxic alcohols" (other than ethanol) such as methanol, 1-propanol, and ethylene glycol metabolize into toxic aldehydes and acids, which cause potentially fatal metabolic acidosis. The commonly available alcohol solvent methanol can cause permanent blindness or death if ingested. The solvent 2-butoxyethanol, used in fracking fluids, can cause hypotension and metabolic acidosis.

=== Chronic exposure ===
Chronic solvent exposures are often caused by the inhalation of solvent vapors, or the ingestion of diluted solvents, repeated over the course of an extended period.

Some solvents can damage internal organs like the liver, the kidneys, the nervous system, or the brain. The cumulative brain effects of long-term or repeated exposure to some solvents is called chronic solvent-induced encephalopathy (CSE).

Chronic exposure to organic solvents in the work environment can produce a range of adverse neuropsychiatric effects. For example, occupational exposure to organic solvents has been associated with higher numbers of painters suffering from alcoholism. Ethanol has a synergistic effect when taken in combination with many solvents; for instance, a combination of toluene/benzene and ethanol causes greater nausea/vomiting than either substance alone.

Some organic solvents are known or suspected to be cataractogenic. A mixture of aromatic hydrocarbons, aliphatic hydrocarbons, alcohols, esters, ketones, and terpenes were found to greatly increase the risk of developing cataracts in the lens of the eye.

=== Environmental contamination ===
A major pathway of induced health effects arises from spills or leaks of solvents, especially chlorinated solvents, that reach the underlying soil. Since solvents readily migrate substantial distances, the creation of widespread soil contamination is not uncommon; this is particularly a health risk if aquifers are affected. Vapor intrusion can occur from sites with extensive subsurface solvent contamination.

== See also ==
- ASTDR
- Construction | Refurbishment | Renovation
- Free energy of solvation
- IARC
- Solvents are often refluxed with an appropriate desiccant prior to distillation to remove water. This may be performed prior to a chemical synthesis where water may interfere with the intended reaction
- List of water-miscible solvents
- Lyoluminescence
- Occupational health
- Partition coefficient (log P) is a measure of differential solubility of a compound in two solvents
- Pollution
- Solvation
- Solvent systems exist outside the realm of ordinary organic solvents: Supercritical fluids, ionic liquids and deep eutectic solvents
- Superfund
- Volatile Organic Compound
- Water model
- Water pollution

== Bibliography ==
- Lowery TH, Richardson KS (1987). Mechanism and Theory in Organic Chemistry (3rd ed.). Harper Collins Publishers. ISBN 978-0-06-364044-3.
