= John Kenneth Stille =

American chemist

- Born: May 8, 1930; Tucson, Arizona, U.S.
- Died: July 19, 1989 (aged 59); Sioux City, Iowa, U.S.
- Known for: Stille reaction
- Scientific career
- Workplaces: Colorado State University
- Thesis: Preparation of the pyridal acetones and the inductive effect of nitrogen on the dehydration of the intermediate aldols polymerization of alpha diolefins with metal alkyl coordination catalysts (1957)
- Doctoral advisor: Carl Shipp Marvel

John Kenneth Stille (May 8, 1930 – July 19, 1989) was an American chemist who discovered the Stille reaction. He received B.A. and M.A. degrees from the University of Arizona before serving in the Navy during the Korean War. He received his Ph.D. from the University of Illinois, where he studied under Carl Shipp Marvel. Stille began his independent career at the University of Iowa in 1957 before moving to Colorado State University in 1977.

While at the University of Arizona, Stille met his wife-to-be, Dolores Engelking. He and Dolores were married in 1958 and had two sons, John Robert and James Kenneth.

Stille was killed at age 59 in the United Airlines Flight 232 crash at Sioux City, Iowa.

In 2010, the Nobel Prize in Chemistry was awarded to Richard F. Heck, Ei-ichi Negishi and Akira Suzuki for their work on palladium-catalyzed cross-coupling reactions. The Stille reaction is a key part of palladium-catalyzed cross-coupling chemistry, and it is thought that Stille was a likely candidate for the Nobel Prize before his untimely death.
