= Acetylenic =

In organic chemistry, the term acetylenic designates

- A doubly unsaturated (sp-hybridized) position on a molecular framework, such as in an alkyne such as acetylene;
- An ethynyl fragment, HC$\equiv$C–, or substituted homologue.

== See also ==
- Allylic
- Propargylic
- Vinylic
