= Vinyl group =

Chemical group (–CH=CH2)

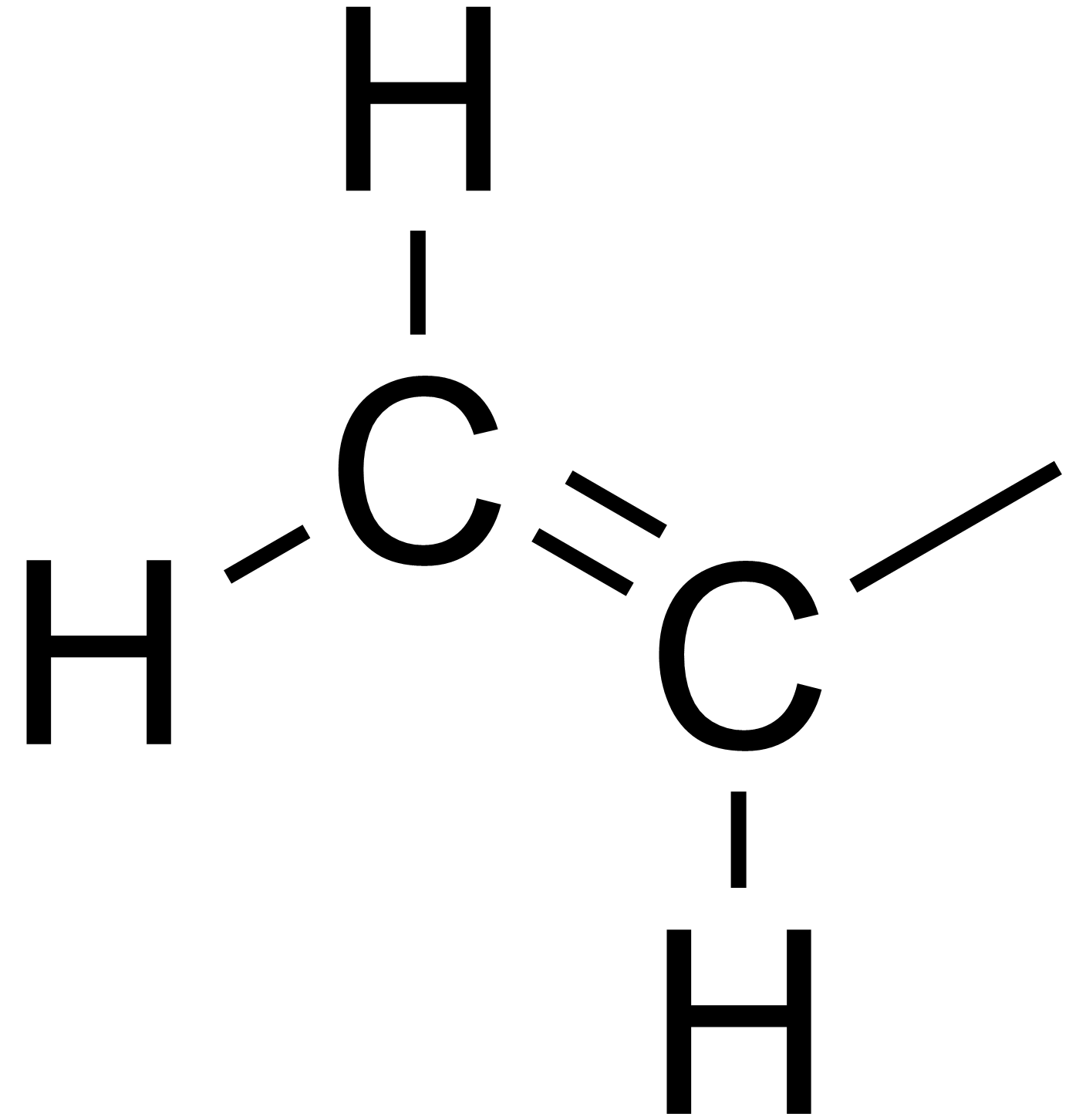
Chemical structure of the vinyl functional group.

In organic chemistry, a vinyl group (abbr. Vi; IUPAC name: ethenyl group) is a functional group with the formula −CH=CH_{2}. It is the ethylene (IUPAC name: ethene) molecule (H_{2}C=CH_{2}) with one fewer hydrogen atom. The name is also used for any compound containing that group, namely R−CH=CH_{2} where R is any other group of atoms.

An industrially important example is vinyl chloride, precursor to PVC, a plastic commonly known as vinyl.

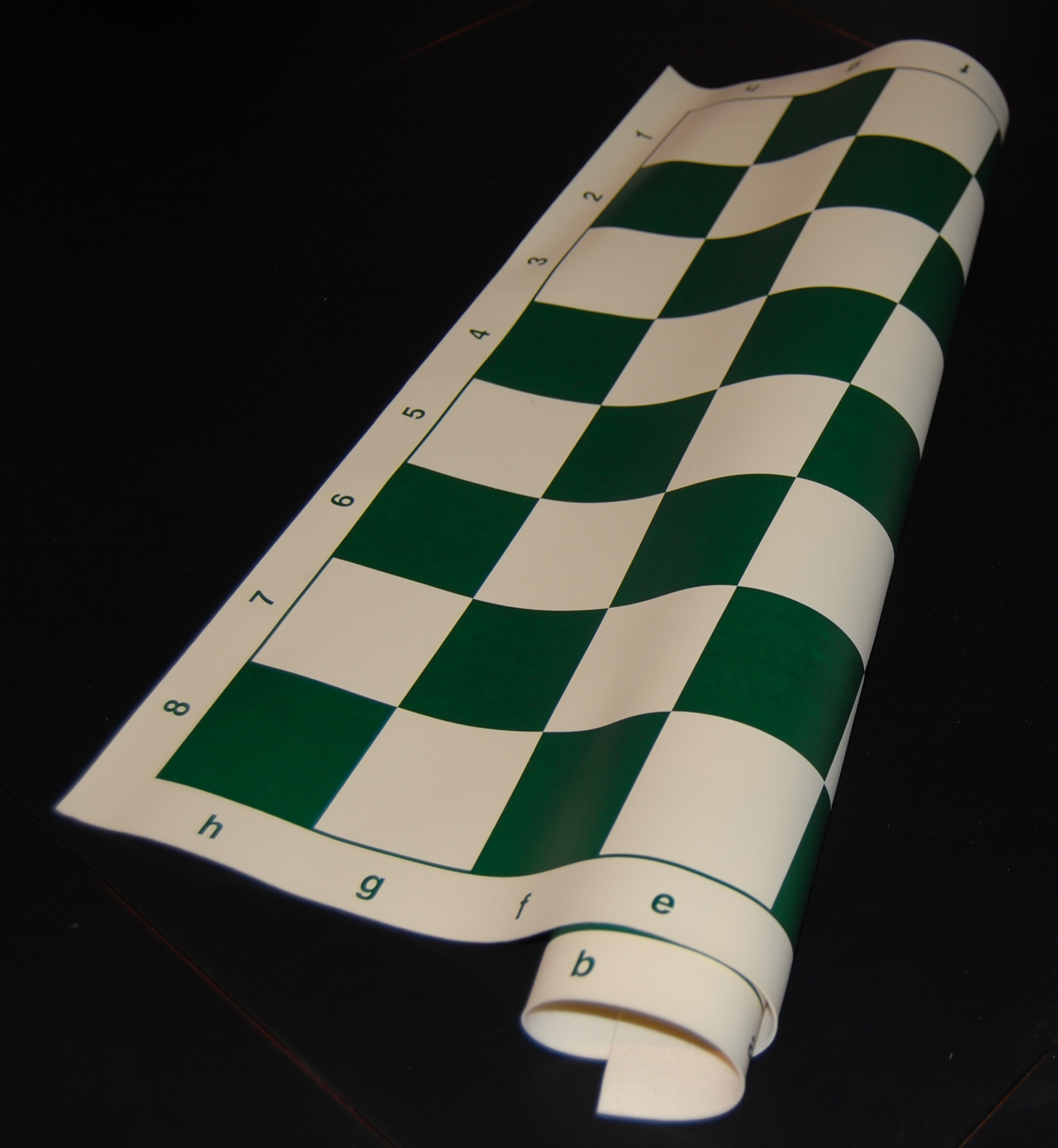
Chessboard made from polyvinyl chloride

Vinyl is one of the alkenyl functional groups. On a carbon skeleton, sp^{2}-hybridized carbons or positions are often called vinylic. Allyls, acrylates and styrenics contain vinyl groups. (A styrenic crosslinker with two vinyl groups is called divinyl benzene.)

== Vinyl polymers ==
Vinyl groups can polymerize with the aid of a radical initiator or a catalyst, forming vinyl polymers. Vinyl polymers contain no vinyl groups. Instead they are saturated. The following table gives some examples of vinyl polymers.

Monomer example	Example of resulting polymer
Vinyl chloride	Polyvinyl chloride (PVC)
Vinyl fluoride	Polyvinyl fluoride (PVF)
Vinyl acetate	Polyvinyl acetate (PVAc)

== Synthesis and reactivity ==
Vinyl derivatives are alkenes. If activated by an adjacent group, the increased polarization of the bond gives rise to characteristic reactivity, which is termed vinylogous:

- In allyl compounds, where the next carbon is saturated but substituted once, allylic rearrangement and related reactions are observed.
  - Allyl Grignard reagents (organomagnesiums) can attack with the vinyl end first.
- If next to an electron-withdrawing group, conjugate addition (Michael addition) can occur.

Vinyl organometallics, e.g. vinyllithium and vinyl tributyltin, participate in vinylations including coupling reactions such as in Negishi coupling.

== History and etymology ==
The radical was first reported by Henri Victor Regnault in 1835 and initially named aldehydène. Due to the incorrect measurement of the atomic mass of carbon it was believed to be C_{4}H_{6} at the time. Then in 1839 it was renamed by Justus von Liebig to "acetyl", because he believed it to be the radical of the acetic acid.

The modern term was coined by German chemist Hermann Kolbe in 1851, who rebutted Liebig's hypothesis. However even in 1860 Marcellin Berthelot still based the name he coined for acetylene on Liebig's nomenclature and not on Kolbe's.

The etymology of "vinyl" is the Latin vinum = "wine", and the Greek word "hylos" 'υλος (matter or material), because of its relationship with ethyl alcohol.

== See also ==
- Acetylenic
- Allylic/Homoallylic
- Alpha-olefin
- Benzylic
- Propargylic/Homopropargylic
- Vinylogous
