= Colin Eaborn =

British scientist & academic

- Born: 15 March 1923; Chester
- Died: 22 February 2004 (aged 80); Brighton
- Education: Bangor University
- Known for: Work structuring the Sussex University, Organosillicon Compounds
- Awards: Frederick Stanley Kipping Award (1964); Organometallic Award (1974); Ingold Award (1976); Main Group Award (1988)
- Scientific career
- Fields: organometallic chemistry
- Workplaces: Bangor University; University College, Leicester; Sussex University

Colin Eaborn FRS (15 March 1923 – 22 February 2004) was a British scientist and academic noted for his work in establishing the Sussex University School of Chemistry and Molecular Sciences. Born to a joiner, he gained first-class honours from Bangor University and, after research during the Second World War, accepted a position as an assistant researcher at University College, Leicester in 1947. In 1951 he won a Rotary Foundation Fellowship, which allowed him to spend a year working at the University of California, Los Angeles with Saul Winstein and his research group, and in 1960 published the seminal Organosilicon Compounds.

In 1961 he was appointed as a science professor at the newly created Sussex University. There he introduced unconventional lecture and degree structures, eventually attracting a staff which, by the mid-1970s, included two Nobel Laureates and seven Fellows of the Royal Society. For his work he was himself made a Fellow of the Royal Society in 1970, and served on the Society Council for two terms during the 1970s and 80s. After retiring from active work in 1988, Eaborn died on 22 February 2004 in Brighton.

== Early life ==
Eaborn was born to a joiner and his wife, with the family moving to Wales when he was six months old to find work. He and his sister went to the Holt Endowed School, the local village school, and from 1934 he studied at Ruabon Grammar School. In 1941 he took up a place at Bangor University to study chemistry, intending to become a teacher after graduation. While there he met Joyce Thomas, an English student, and the two married in 1949. At Bangor, Eaborn obtained First Class Honours, and his studies were greatly assisted by the appointment of the noted chemist Ted Hughes in 1943. After graduation, Eaborn continued to work at Bangor under legislation which required graduating scientists to work towards the war effort.

== Academic work ==
In 1947, Eaborn became an assistant researcher at University College, Leicester. At the time it was a small department with five members of staff and little money for research, but despite that he published his first academic paper in 1949, based on work he had done at Bangor, and continued to publish research papers, eventually numbering over 500. In 1950 he was made a Lecturer, and in 1954 a Reader as part of Leicester's attempts to gain university status, which required people noted enough to raise its profile. In 1951 he was granted a Rotary Foundation Fellowship, which allowed him to spend a year working at the University of California, Los Angeles with Saul Winstein and his research group. Thanks to grants from the United States Air Force and Army, Eaborn was able to assemble a team of 15 researchers and students, and in 1960 published the textbook Organosillicon Compounds, which had "a major influence on the development of what has become one of the most prolific areas of organometallic chemistry, with extensive applications in organic synthesis, catalysis and materials science".

In 1961, Eaborn accepted an appointment as one of the first four science professors of Sussex University. While there he massively restructured the School of Chemistry and Molecular Sciences, moving from a department of four scientists to a faculty of 40 in the mid-1970s, including two Nobel Laureates and seven Fellows of the Royal Society. Rather than dividing the department per speciality, each area (organic, inorganic and physical chemistry) intermingled, with researchers encouraged to share work and collaborate. Eaborn also introduced the "degree by thesis" program, in which students would be granted their degree after a thesis and an oral exam rather than traditional written exams; this was successful in attracting "original and self-motivated" who had not completed the conventional education program prior to university.

Eaborn introduced "crash courses", where a subject would be crammed into a period of weeks rather than spread out over a year, and served as the first Dean of the School of Molecular Sciences until 1968, and from then until 1972 the first Pro-vice-chancellor for Science. He retired in 1988, and died in his sleep after a long illness on 22 February 2004.

== Recognition and other work ==
Eaborn became the first non-American to receive the Frederick Stanley Kipping Award of the American Chemical Society, which was awarded based on his various articles and publications. From 1963 to 1993 he served as a regional editor of the Journal of Organometallic Chemistry, and in 1970 he was elected a Fellow of the Royal Society, serving on its council between 1978 and 1980 and again between 1988 and 1989. Between 1965 and 1970 he was the Honorary Secretary of the Royal Society of Chemistry, receiving its Organometallic Award in 1974, the Ingold Award in 1976 and the Main Group Award in 1988.
