= Vinyl tributyltin =

Names
- Preferred IUPAC name Tributyl(ethenyl)stannane
- Other names Tributylvinyltin, Tributylvinylstannane

Identifiers
CAS Number	7486-35-3
3D model (JSmol)	Interactive image
ChemSpider	74003
ECHA InfoCard	100.028.447
EC Number	231-291-4
PubChem CID	81998
UNII	2FA6XM467X
CompTox Dashboard (EPA)	DTXSID40225836
- InChI: InChI=1S/3C4H9.C2H3.Sn/c3*1-3-4-2;1-2;/h3*1,3-4H2,2H3;1H,2H2; Key: QIWRFOJWQSSRJZ-UHFFFAOYSA-N
- SMILES: CCCC[Sn](CCCC)(CCCC)C=C

Properties
Chemical formula	C_{14}H_{30}Sn
Molar mass	317.104 g·mol^{−1}
Appearance	colorless oil
Density	1.081 g/cm^{3}
Boiling point	104–106 °C (219–223 °F; 377–379 K) 3.5 mmHg

Hazards
- GHS labelling
Pictograms	(GHS02: Flammable) (GHS06: Toxic) (GHS07: Exclamation mark) (GHS08: Health hazard) (GHS09: Environmental hazard)
Signal word	Danger
Hazard statements	H226, H301, H312, H315, H319, H372, H410
Precautionary statements	P210, P233, P240, P241, P242, P243, P260, P264, P270, P273, P280, P301+P310, P302+P352, P303+P361+P353, P305+P351+P338, P312, P314, P321, P322, P330, P332+P313, P337+P313, P362, P363, P370+P378, P391, P403+P235, P405, P501
- Except where otherwise noted, data are given for materials in their standard state (at 25 °C [77 °F], 100 kPa). Infobox references

Vinyl tributyltin is an organotin compound with the formula Bu_{3}SnCH=CH_{2} (Bu = butyl). It is used as a source of vinyl anion equivalent in Stille coupling reactions. As a source of vinyltin reagents, early work used vinyl trimethyltin, but trimethyltin compounds are avoided nowadays owing to their toxicity.

== Preparation ==
The compound is prepared by the reaction of vinylmagnesium bromide with tributyltin chloride. It can be synthesized in the laboratory by hydrostannylation of acetylene with tributyltin hydride. It is commercially available.
