= Associative substitution =

Process of exchange of ligands between coordination compounds

Associative substitution describes a pathway by which compounds interchange ligands. The terminology is typically applied to organometallic and coordination complexes, but resembles the Sn2 mechanism in organic chemistry. The opposite pathway is dissociative substitution, being analogous to the Sn1 pathway. Intermediate pathways exist between the pure associative and pure dissociative pathways, these are called interchange mechanisms.

Associative pathways are characterized by binding of the attacking nucleophile to give a discrete, detectable intermediate followed by loss of another ligand. Complexes that undergo associative substitution are either coordinatively unsaturated or contain a ligand that can change its bonding to the metal, e.g. change in hapticity or bending of a nitrogen oxide ligand (NO). In homogeneous catalysis, the associative pathway is desirable because the binding event, and hence the selectivity of the reaction, depends not only on the nature of the metal catalyst but also on the substrate.

Examples of associative mechanisms are commonly found in the chemistry of 16e square planar metal complexes, e.g. Vaska's complex and tetrachloroplatinate. These compounds (MX_{4}) bind the incoming (substituting) ligand Y to form pentacoordinate intermediates MX_{4}Y that in a subsequent step dissociates one of their ligands. Dissociation of Y results in no detectable net reaction, but dissociation of X results in net substitution, giving the 16e complex MX_{3}Y. The first step is typically rate determining. Thus, the entropy of activation is negative, which indicates an increase in order in the system. These reactions follow second order kinetics: the rate of the appearance of product depends on the concentration of MX_{4} and Y. The rate law is governed by the Eigen–Wilkins Mechanism.

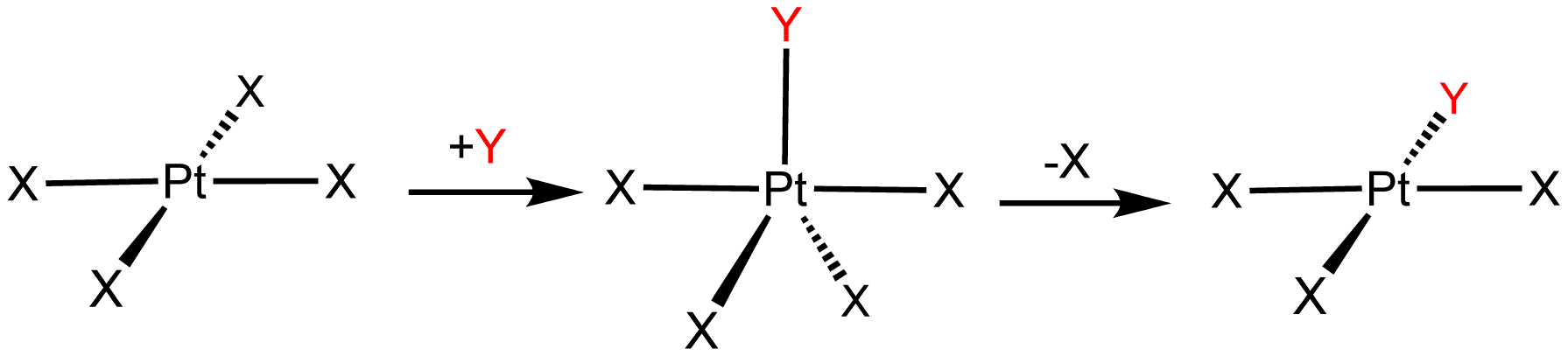

== Associative interchange pathway ==
In many substitution reactions, well-defined intermediates are not observed, when the rate of such processes are influenced by the nature of the entering ligand, the pathway is called associative interchange, abbreviated I_{a}. Representative is the interchange of bulk and coordinated water in [V(H_{2}O)_{6}]^{2+}. In contrast, the slightly more compact ion [Ni(H_{2}O)_{6}]^{2+} exchanges water via the I_{d}.

== Effects of ion pairing ==
Polycationic complexes tend to form ion pairs with anions and these ion pairs often undergo reactions via the I_{a} pathway. The electrostatically held nucleophile can exchange positions with a ligand in the first coordination sphere, resulting in net substitution. An illustrative process comes from the "anation" (reaction with an anion) of chromium(III) hexaaquo complex:

[Cr(H_{2}O)_{6}]^{3+} + SCN^{−} ⇌ {[Cr(H_{2}O)_{6}], NCS}^{2+}
{[Cr(H_{2}O)_{6}], NCS}^{2+} ⇌ [Cr(H_{2}O)_{5}NCS]^{2+} + H_{2}O

== Special ligand effects ==
In special situations, some ligands participate in substitution reactions leading to associative pathways. These ligands can adopt multiple motifs for binding to the metal, each of which involves a different number of electrons "donated." A classic case is the indenyl effect in which an indenyl ligand reversibly "slips' from pentahapto (η^{5}) coordination to trihapto (η^{3}). Other pi-ligands behave in this way, e.g. allyl (η^{3} to η^{1}) and naphthalene (η^{6} to η^{4}). Nitric oxide typically binds to metals to make a linear MNO arrangement, wherein the nitrogen oxide is said to donate 3e^{^{−}} to the metal. In the course of substitution reactions, the MNO unit can bend, converting the 3e^{−} linear NO ligand to a 1e^{−} bent NO ligand.

== S_{N}1cB mechanism ==
The rate for the hydrolysis of cobalt(III) ammine halide complexes are deceptive, appearing to be associative but proceeding by an alternative pathway. The hydrolysis of [Co(NH_{3})_{5}Cl]^{2+} follows second order kinetics: the rate increases linearly with concentration of hydroxide as well as the starting complex. Based on this information, the reactions would appear to proceed via nucleophilic attack of hydroxide at cobalt. Studies show, however, that the hydroxide deprotonates one NH_{3} ligand to give the conjugate base of the starting complex, i.e., [Co(NH_{3})_{4}(NH_{2})Cl]^{+}. In this monovalent cation, the chloride spontaneously dissociates. This pathway is called the S_{N}1cB mechanism.

== Eigen-Wilkins mechanism ==
The Eigen-Wilkins mechanism, named after chemists Manfred Eigen and R. G. Wilkins, is a mechanism and rate law in coordination chemistry governing associative substitution reactions of octahedral complexes. It was discovered for substitution by ammonia of a chromium-(III) hexaaqua complex. The key feature of the mechanism is an initial rate-determining pre-equilibrium to form an encounter complex ML_{6}-Y from reactant ML_{6} and incoming ligand Y. This equilibrium is represented by the constant K_{E}:

ML_{6} + Y ⇌ ML_{6}-Y

The subsequent dissociation to form product is governed by a rate constant k:

ML_{6}-Y → ML_{5}Y + L

A simple derivation of the Eigen-Wilkins rate law follows:

[ML_{6}-Y] = K_{E}[ML_{6}][Y]
[ML_{6}-Y] = [M]_{tot} - [ML_{6}]

rate = k[ML_{6}-Y]
rate = kK_{E}[Y][ML_{6}]

Leading to the final form of the rate law, using the steady-state approximation (d[ML_{6}-Y] / dt = 0),

rate = kK_{E}[Y][M]_{tot} / (1 + K_{E}[Y])

=== Eigen-Fuoss equation ===
A further insight into the pre-equilibrium step and its equilibrium constant K_{E} comes from the Fuoss-Eigen equation proposed independently by Eigen and R. M. Fuoss:

K_{E} = (4πa^{3}/3000) x N_{A}exp(-V/RT)

Where a represents the minimum distance of approach between complex and ligand in solution (in cm), N_{A} is the Avogadro constant, R is the gas constant and T is the reaction temperature. V is the electrostatic potential energy of the ions at that distance:

V = z_{1}z_{2}e^{2}/4πaε

Where z is the charge number of each species and ε is the vacuum permittivity.

A typical value for K_{E} is 0.0202 dm^{3}mol^{−1} for neutral particles at a distance of 200 pm. The result of the rate law is that at high concentrations of Y, the rate approximates k[M]_{tot} while at low concentrations the result is kK_{E}[M]_{tot}[Y]. The Eigen-Fuoss equation shows that higher values of K_{E} (and thus a faster pre-equilibrium) are obtained for large, oppositely-charged ions in solution.
