= SN1CB mechanism =

Chemical reactions by which metal amine complexes exchange ligands

In coordination chemistry, the S_{N}1cB (conjugate base) mechanism describes the pathway by which many metal amine complexes undergo substitution, that is, ligand exchange. Typically, the reaction entails reaction of a polyamino metal halide with aqueous base to give the corresponding polyamine metal hydroxide:

$$\ce{[Co(NH3)5Cl]^2+ + OH- -> [Co(NH3)5OH]^2+ + Cl-}$$

The rate law for the reaction is:

$$r=k[\mathrm{Co(NH_3)_5Cl^{2+}}][\mathrm{OH}^-]$$

The rate law is deceptive: hydroxide serves not as a nucleophile but as a base to deprotonate the coordinated ammonia. Simultaneously with deprotonation, the halide dissociates. Water binds to the coordinatively unsaturated complex followed by proton transfer to give the hydroxy complex. The conjugate base resulting from deprotonation of the amine is rarely observed.
