= Dissociative substitution =

Series of chemical reactions by which compounds exchange ligands

In chemistry, dissociative substitution describes a reaction pathway by which compounds interchange ligands. The term is typically applied to coordination and organometallic complexes, but resembles the S_{N}1 mechanism in organic chemistry. This pathway can be well described by the cis effect, or the labilization of CO ligands in the cis position. The opposite pathway is associative substitution, being analogous to S_{N}2 pathway. Pathways that are intermediate between the pure dissociative and pure associative pathways are called interchange mechanisms.

Complexes that undergo dissociative substitution are often coordinatively saturated and often have octahedral molecular geometry. The entropy of activation is characteristically positive for these reactions, which indicates that the disorder of the reacting system increases in the rate-determining step.

== Kinetics ==
Dissociative pathways are characterized by a rate determining step that involves release of a ligand from the coordination sphere of the metal undergoing substitution. The concentration of the substituting nucleophile has no influence on this rate, and an intermediate of reduced coordination number can be detected. The reaction can be described with k_{1}, k_{−1} and k_{2}, which are the rate constants of their corresponding intermediate reaction steps:

$$\ce{L_\mathit{n}M-L <=>[-\mathrm L, k_1][+\mathrm L, k_{-1}] L_\mathit{n}M-\Box ->[+\mathrm L', k_2] L_\mathit{n}M-L'}$$

Normally the rate determining step is the dissociation of L from the complex, and [L'] does not affect the rate of reaction, leading to the simple rate equation:

$$\ce{Rate = \mathit{k}_1 [L_\mathit{n}M-L]}$$

However, in some cases, the back reaction (k_{−1}) becomes important, and [L'] can exert an effect on the overall rate of reaction. The backward reaction k_{−1} therefore competes with the second forward reaction (k_{2}), thus the fraction of intermediate (denoted as "Int") that can react with L' to form the product is given by the expression $\ce{\frac{\mathit k_2[L'][Int]}{{\mathit k_{-1}[L][Int]}+\mathit k_2[L'][Int]}}$, which leads us to the overall rate equation:

$$\ce{Rate_{overall}} = \left(\frac{k_2[\ce L'][Int]}{{k_{-1}[\ce L][Int]}+k_2[\ce L'][Int]}\right)({k_1 [\ce{L_\mathit{n}M-L}]}) = \frac{k_1 k_2[\ce L'][\ce{L_\mathit{n}M-L}]}{{k_{-1}[\ce L]}+k_2[\ce L']}$$

When [L] is small and negligible, the above complex equation reduces to the simple rate equation that depends on k_{1} and [L_{n}M-L] only.

== Dissociative interchange pathway ==
Interchange pathways apply to substitution reactions where intermediates are not observed, which is more common than pure dissociative pathways. If the reaction rate is insensitive to the nature of the attacking nucleophile, the process is called dissociative interchange, abbreviated I_{d}. An illustrative process comes from the "anation" (reaction with an anion) of cobalt(III) complexes:

$$\ce{[Co(NH3)5(H2O)]^3+ + SCN- <=> \{[Co(NH3)5(H2O)], NCS \}^2+}$$
$$\ce{\{[Co(NH3)5(H2O)], NCS \}^2+ <=> [Co(NH3)5NCS]^2+ + H2O}$$

== Water exchange ==
The exchange between bulk and coordinated water is of fundamental interest as a measure of the intrinsic kinetic lability of metal ions. This rate is relevant to toxicity, catalysis, magnetic resonance imaging, and other effects. For octahedral mono- and dicationic aquo complexes, these exchange processes occur via an interchange pathway that has more or less dissociative character. Rates vary by a factor of 10^{18}, [Ir(H_{2}O)_{6}]^{3+} being the slowest and [Na(H_{2}O)_{6}]^{+} being one of the fastest for octahedral complexes. Charge has a significant influence on these rates but non-electrostatic effects are also important.

== Sn1CB mechanism ==
The rate for the hydrolysis of cobalt(III) ammine (NH_{3}-containing) halide complexes are deceptive, appearing to be associative but proceeding by a pathway that is dissociative in character. The hydrolysis of [Co(NH_{3})_{5}Cl]^{2+} follows second order kinetics: the rate increases linearly with concentration of hydroxide as well as the starting complex. Studies show, however, that in the hydroxide deprotonates one NH_{3} ligand to give the conjugate base of the starting complex, i.e., [Co(NH_{3})_{4}(NH_{2})Cl]^{+}. In this monocation, the chloride spontaneously dissociates from this conjugate base of the starting complex. This pathway is called the Sn1CB mechanism.
