= Anation =

In coordination chemistry, anation is the "replacement of the ligand water by an anion in a coordination entity." The term is however used more loosely to include displacement of any neutral ligand by an anion. The reaction is pervasive in coordination chemistry. The reverse reaction, displacement of an anionic ligand by water, is called aquation.

== Example ==
An example is the conversion of the aquo complex [Co(NH_{3})_{5}(H_{2}O)]^{3+} with bromide to give pentamminecobalt(III) bromide complex:

[Co(NH_{3})_{5}(H_{2}O)]^{3+} + Br^{−} → [Co(NH_{3})_{5}Br]^{2+} + H_{2}O

The mechanism of such reactions often invoke ion-pairing of the entering anion in the second coordination sphere followed by dissociation of the aquo ligand.
