= Grob fragmentation =

Chemical reaction

A Grob fragmentation is an elimination reaction that breaks a neutral aliphatic chain into three fragments: a positive ion spanning atoms 1 and 2 (the "electrofuge"), an unsaturated neutral fragment spanning positions 3 and 4, and a negative ion (the "nucleofuge") comprising the rest of the chain.

For example, the positive ion may be a carbenium, carbonium or acylium ion; the neutral fragment could be an alkene, alkyne, or imine; and the negative fragment could be a tosyl or hydroxyl ion:

Grob fragmentation

The reaction is named for the Swiss chemist Cyril A. Grob.

Alternately, atom 1 could begin as an anion, in which case it becomes neutral rather than going from neutral to cationic.

== History ==
An early instance of fragmentation is the dehydration of di(tert-butyl)methanol yielding 2-methyl-2-butene and isobutene, a reaction described in 1933 by Frank C. Whitmore. This reaction proceeds by formation of a secondary carbocation followed by a rearrangement reaction to a more stable tertiary carbocation and elimination of a t-butyl cation:

Fragmentation Whitmore

Albert Eschenmoser in 1952 investigated the base catalysed fragmentation of certain beta hydroxy ketones:

Fragmentation Eschenmoser 1952

The original work by Grob (1955) concerns the formation of 1,5-hexadiene from cis- or trans-1,4-dibromocyclohexane by sodium metal:

Grob fragmentation 1955

According to reviewers Prantz and Mulzer (2010), the name Grob fragmentation was chosen "in more or less glaring disregard of the earlier contributions".

== Reaction mechanism ==
The reaction mechanism varies with reactant and reaction conditions with the fragmentation taking place in a concerted reaction or taking place in two steps with a carbocationic intermediate when the nucleofuge leaves first or taking place in two steps with an anionic intermediate when the electrofuge leaves first. The carbanionic pathway is more common and is facilitated by the stability of the cation formed and the leaving group ability of the nucleofuge. With cyclic substrates, the preferred geometry of elimination is for the sigma bond that drives out the leaving group to being anti to it, analogous to the conformational orientation in the E2 mechanism of elimination reactions.

== Examples ==
=== Thapsigargin from Wieland–Miescher ketone ===
An example of a Grob-like fragmentation in organic synthesis is the expansion of the Wieland–Miescher ketone to thapsigargin:

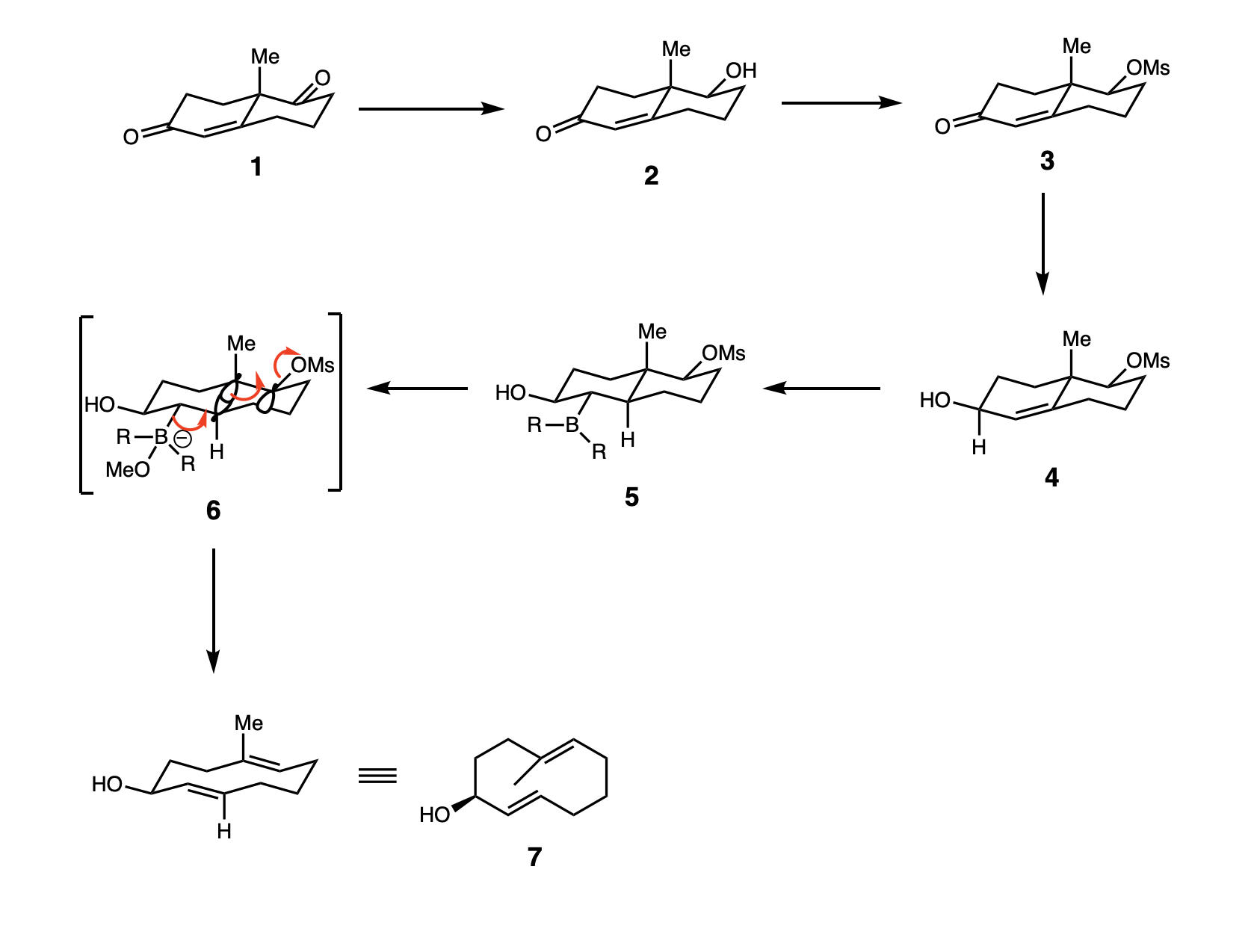
Scheme 2. Grob-like fragmentation

In this reaction, diastereoselective reduction of the ketone 1 with sodium borohydride yields alcohol 2, which is functionalized to the mesylate 3 with mesyl chloride in pyridine. The selectivity of the initial reduction of ketone 1 is a result of borohyride approaching from the bottom face to avoid steric clash with the axial methyl group. Then reduction of the enone to allyl alcohol 4 with tri-tert-butoxyaluminium hydride in tetrahydrofuran followed by hydroboration with borane in THF yields the borane 5 (only one substituent displayed for clarity). The diastereoselectivity of the hydroboration is a result of two factors: avoidance of the axial methyl group as well as axial hydride addition to avoid a twist-boat conformation in the transition state. The Grob fragmentation to 6 takes place with sodium methoxide in methanol at reflux. A methoxide group attacks the boron atom giving a borate complex which fragments. As each boron atom can hold three substrate molecules (R), the ultimate boron byproduct is trimethyl borate. As seen in 6, the mesylate being in the equatorial position allows its sigma star orbital to align ideally with the sigma bond drawn, allowing for the correct olefin geometry seen in 7.

Another example is an epoxy alcohol fragmentation reaction as part of the Holton Taxol total synthesis.

== aza-Grob fragmentation ==
3-aza-Grob fragmentation is variation which takes place when an electrofuge and nucleofuge are situated at positions 1 and 5 on a secondary or tertiary amine chain with the nitrogen at the 3 position. The reaction products are an electrofugal fragment, an imine, and a nucleofugal fragment (such as an alcohol).

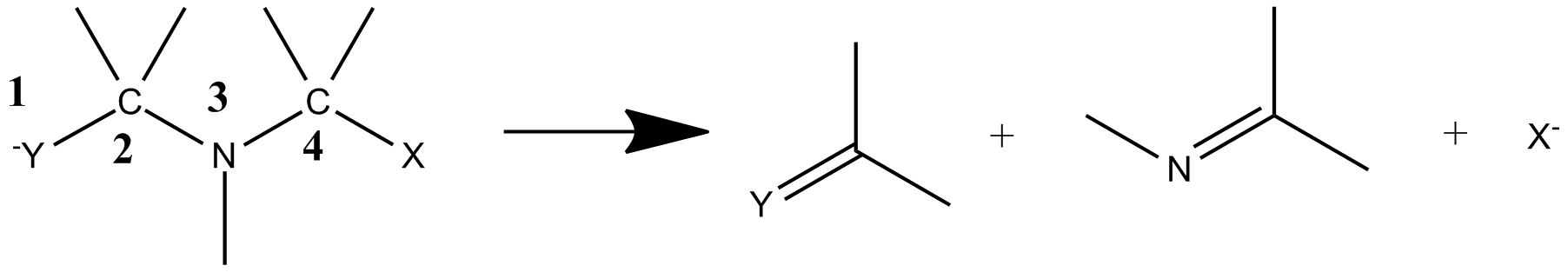
3-Aza-Grob Fragmentation Scheme

3-aza-Grob fragmentation can proceed with several different nucleofuges. The reaction mechanism has been reported to begin with the reduction of an ether protected amide to form a secondary alcohol. Fragmentation then takes place in a concerted step to form the reaction products.

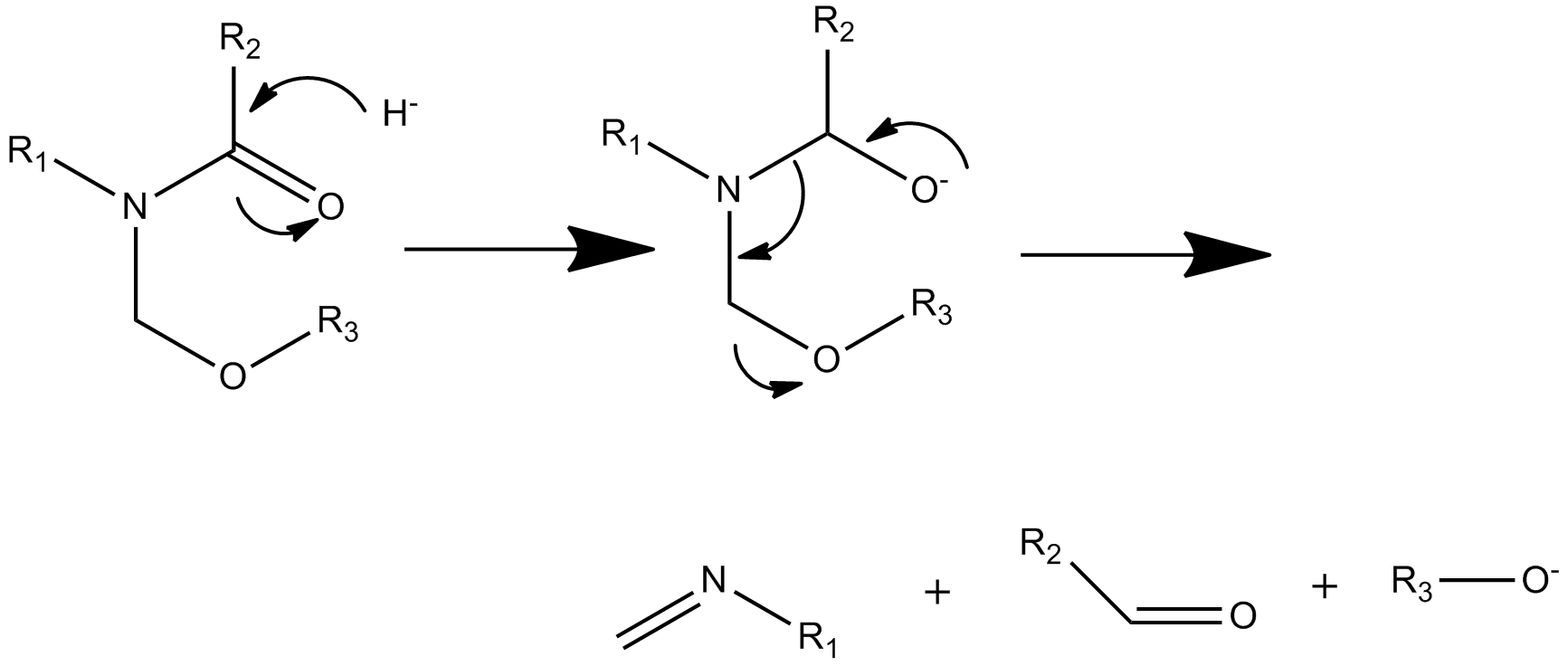
3-Aza-Grob Fragmentation Mechanism

The scope of the reaction has been found to cover THF and tetrahydrothiophene protecting groups using various hydride agents.

== See also ==
- Eschenmoser fragmentation
- Wharton reaction
