= Eschenmoser fragmentation =

Chemical reaction

The Eschenmoser fragmentation, first published in 1967, is the chemical reaction of α,β-epoxyketones (1) with aryl sulfonylhydrazines (2) to give alkynes (3) and carbonyl compounds (4). The reaction is named after the Swiss chemist Albert Eschenmoser, who devised it in collaboration with an industrial research group of Günther Ohloff, and applied it to the production of muscone and related macrocyclic musks. The reaction is also sometimes known as the Eschenmoser–Ohloff fragmentation or the Eschenmoser–Tanabe fragmentation as Masato Tanabe independently published an article on the reaction the same year. The general formula of the fragmentation using p-toluenesulfonylhydrazide is:

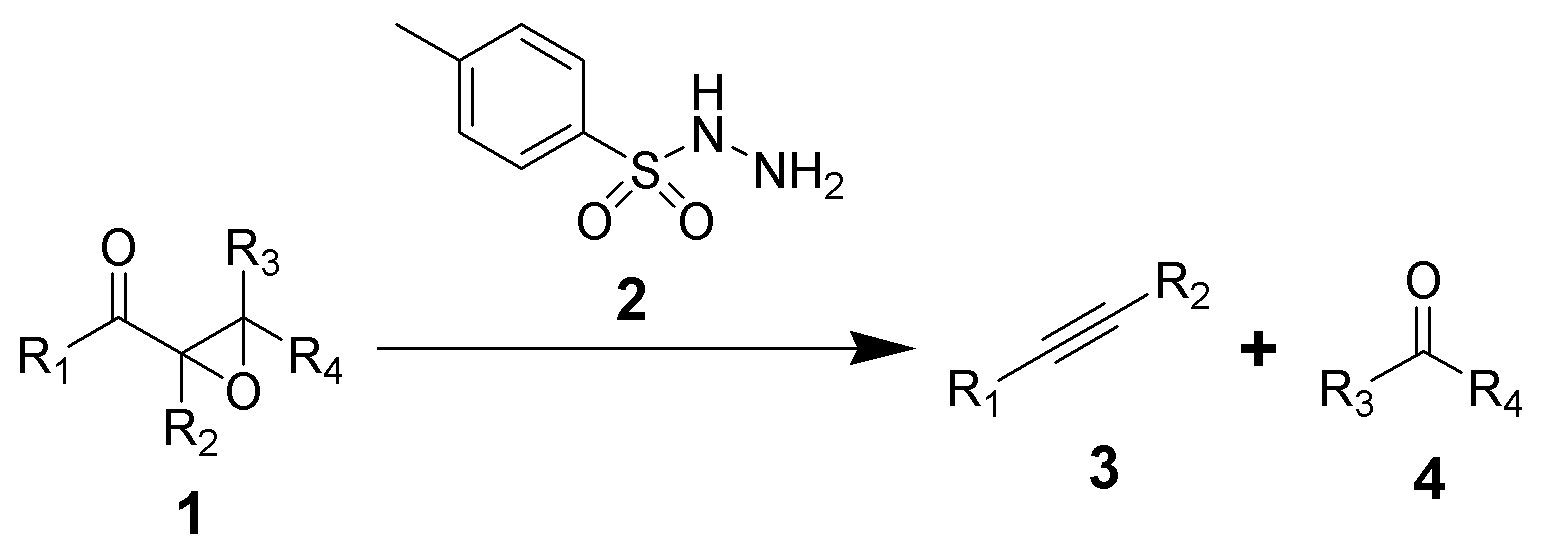

Several examples exist in the literature, and the reaction is also carried out on industrial scale.

== Reaction mechanism ==
The mechanism of the Eschenmoser fragmentation begins with the condensation of an α,β-epoxyketone (1) with an aryl sulfonylhydrazine (2) to afford the intermediate hydrazone (3). This hydrazone can either be protonated at the epoxide oxygen or deprotonated at the sulfonamide nitrogen to initiate the fragmentation, and thus the fragmentation is catalyzed by acids or bases. Most common reaction conditions, however, are treatment with acetic acid in dichloromethane. The proton transfer leads to intermediate (4), which undergoes the key fragmentation to alkyne (6) and the corresponding carbonyl compound (7). The driving force for the reaction is the formation of highly stable molecular nitrogen.

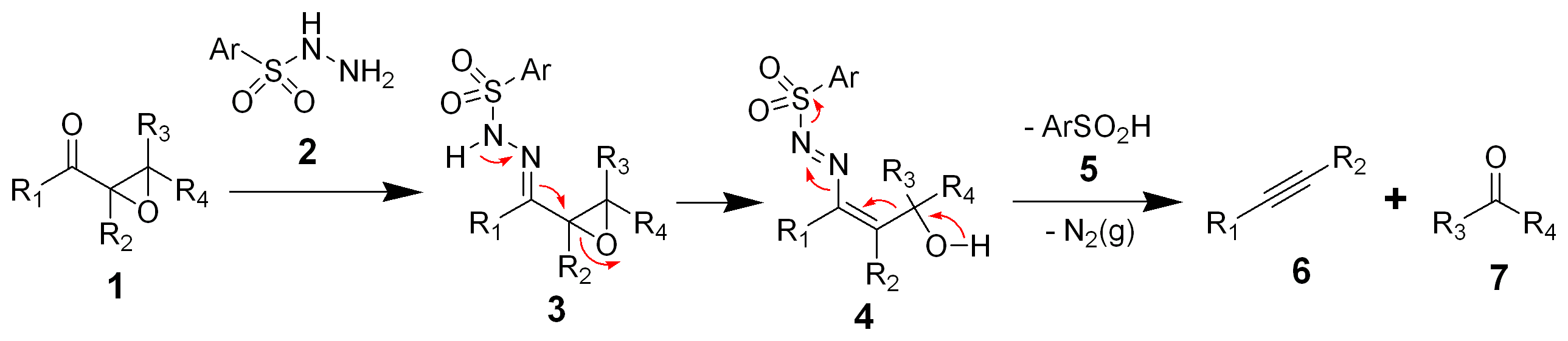
The reaction mechanism of the Eschenmoser fragmentation

There is a radical variant of this α,β-enone to alkynone fragmentation in which no epoxide is required. 1,3-Dibromo-5,5-dimethylhydantoin (DBDMH) in sec-butanol with the appropriate p-tolylhydrazone has been used to prepare exaltone (cyclopentadecanone) and muscone (the 3-methyl structural analog). The α,β-unsaturated hydrazone is brominated by DBDMH in the allylic position (relative to the sulfonamide nitrogen), leading to a captodatively stabilized radical, and the bromide ion becomes the leaving group in the subsequent nucleophilic attack by an alcoholate ion. This Fehr–Ohloff–Büchi variant of the Eschenmoser–Ohloff fragramentation in which an epoxidation step is avoided is suited to sterically demanding substrates where low yields typically result from classical Eschenmoser fragmentation.

A closely related fragmentation has been reported, employing diazirine derivatives of cyclic α,β-epoxyketones.

== See also ==
- Grob fragmentation
- Wharton reaction
- Shapiro reaction
- Abidi alkyne synthesis
