= Philip Kraft =

German chemist (born 1969)

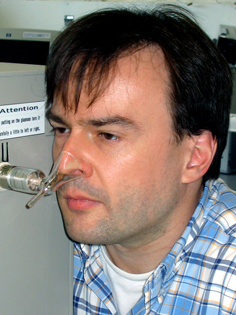
Philip Kraft smelling on a gas chromatograph

Philip Kraft (born in Rendsburg on March 24, 1969) is a German organic chemist. Since 1996 he has been employed by Givaudan, a leading Flavor and Fragrance company, where he designs captive odorants for use in perfumes. He has lectured at the University of Bern, the University of Zurich, and the ETH Zurich.

== Career ==
Kraft's interest in fragrance chemistry and perfumery was awakened in 1986 by an article on rose oxide analogs, which led to contacts with Haarmann & Reimer (now Symrise), where he was introduced to the world of scents and fragrances. After graduation from high school and military service which involved forensic and analytical chemistry, he studied chemistry from 1989–1994 at the University of Kiel. He obtained his degree while working in Werner Tochtermann's group, then continued his research with this group, producing his PhD thesis on the synthesis of macrocyclic musks in 1996. Moving to industry, he joined Givaudan's Fragrance Research center of in Dübendorf (Switzerland) in 1996 as the head of an organic synthesis laboratory. In 2001 he participated in an expedition with Roman Kaiser to the primary rain forest of the Masoala peninsula (Madagascar) in search of new natural leads. That same year, he was promoted to group leader for the discovery of new odorants. His primary research interests are the rational design of new odorants, molecular modeling, and structure–odor correlations, particularly in the domain of musks and floral odorants. Since 2008 he has taught courses in fragrance chemistry at the University of Bern, the University of Zurich, and the ETH Zurich.

== Publications and patents ==
Kraft, as of 2014, has authored 78 papers in peer-reviewed chemistry journals, and is inventor or co-inventor of 30 patents. Highly cited reviews include “Fragrance Chemistry“, “Odds and Trends: Recent Developments in the Chemistry of Odorants”, “New and Unusual Natural Products of Fascinating Flower Scents“, and a book chapter on “Musks”. He co-organized the Flavor & Fragrance conference series of the Royal Society of Chemistry and the Society of the Chemical Industry in Manchester 2004 and London 2007, and the Gesellschaft Deutscher Chemiker at Leipzig in 2013.

Kraft was the research instigator and lead author of From Rallet No1 to Chanel No5 versus Mademoiselle Chanel No1 which explored the work of perfumer Ernest Beaux leading to the creation of Chanel's No.5.

== Books ==
- Philip Kraft, Karl A. D. Swift, “Perspectives in Flavor and Fragrance Research”, Verlag Helvetica Chimica Acta, Zurich, and WILEY-VCH Verlag, Weinheim, 2005, ISBN 3-906390-36-5.
- Philip Kraft, Karl A. D. Swift, “Current Topics in Flavor and Fragrance Research”, Verlag Helvetica Chimica Acta, Zurich, and WILEY-VCH Verlag, Weinheim, 2008, ISBN 978-3-906390-49-9.
- Günther Ohloff, Wilhelm Pickenhagen, Philip Kraft: “Scent and Chemistry – The Molecular World of Odors”, Verlag Helvetica Chimica Acta, Zurich, 2011, ISBN 978-3-906390-66-6.

== Invented Materials ==
- Super Muguet (6-ethyl-3-methyloct-6-en-1-ol, 2001), non-sensitizing muguet alcohol: »Marc Jacobs Men« (Givenchy, 2003).
- Azurone (7-isopentyl-2H-benzo[b][1,4]dioxepin-3(4H)-one, 2004), potent marine odorant: »Oscar Marina Spirit« (Oscar de la Renta, 2005), »Sécrétions Magnifiques« (Etat Libre d'Orange, 2007).
- Pomarose ((2E)-5,6,7-trimethylocta-2,5-dien-4-one, 2005), diffusive damascone mimic: »Be Delicious for Men« (DKNY, 2005), »Unforgivable« (Sean John, 2006), »Unforgivable Woman« (Sean John, 2007), »John Galliano« (John Galliano, 2008), »1 Million« (Paco Rabanne, 2008), »CK free« (Calvin Klein, 2009).
- Serenolide (2-(1-(3,3-dimethylcyclohexyl)ethoxy)-2-methylpropyl cyclopropanecarboxylate, 2006), linear musk odorant: »Polo Double Black« (Ralph Lauren, 2006), »Unforgivable Woman« (Sean John, 2007), »John Galliano« (John Galliano, 2008). This substance showed only weak potential for skin sensitization.
- Sylkolide ((3' E)-2-((3',5'-dimethylhex-3'-en-2'-yl)oxy)-2-methylpropyl cyclopropanecarboxylate, 2010), linear top-note musk: »Core for Men« (GAP, 2010).
- Cassyrane (2-(tert-butyl)-5-methyl-2-propyl-2,5-dihydrofuran, 2010), sulfur-free cassis top note.
