= Masato Tanabe =

American scientist

- Education: UC Berkeley
- Known for: Contributions to drug discovery
- Awards: SRI Fellow (1984); JPMA Distinguished Service Award (2001); SRI Hall of Fame (2004)
- Scientific career
- Workplaces: SRI International
- Doctoral advisor: William G. Dauben

Masato "Mas" Tanabe was a drug researcher at SRI International, where he spent 45 years studying steroid hormones, which are instrumental in combatting breast cancer and prostate cancer.

== Education ==
Tanabe graduated from the University of San Francisco in 1947 with a degree in chemistry; his thesis was "Studies in the hydroaromatic series". Tanabe would go on to study under professor William G. Dauben at the University of California, Berkeley.

== Career ==
Tanabe was program manager of Steroid Chemistry group, then director of SRI's Bio-Organic Chemistry Laboratory for much of his career, and later the director of SRI's Pharmaceutical Chemistry group. In 1967, he was on a team that discovered Eschenmoser-Tanabe fragmentation. Much of the work was sponsored by the National Institute of Health and Schering Plough, the latter of which has at least eight patents and 30 journal articles via work sponsored at SRI. Other notable accomplishments include the use of stable isotopes to study metabolism. He inserted Carbon-13 into antibiotics to demonstrate how microbes can assemble antibiotics to defend themselves, then used magnetic resonance spectroscopy to determine how the antibiotic was formed.

His work resulted in the development of the steroid SR16234, which has been used to treat breast cancer. A compound discovered in a previous contract from NIH showed potential - it acted like "anti-estrogen" in the breasts and uterus but like normal estrogen elsewhere in the body, and were thus more "tissue-selective". A contract was proposed to Taiho Pharmaceutical in July 1996, and within six years and slightly under $3 million (an unusually short amount of time) two new drugs were discovered and tested on people (particularly people for which tamoxifen has failed): SR16234 and SR16287. The first of those, SR16234, also inhibited the growth of blood vessels (angiogenesis) and accelerated the death of cancer cells (apoptosis) and thus was particularly well suited to be an anti-cancer drug. As of August 2010, the drug had been through five Phase I and two Phase II studies, and Phase III studies are being planned.

== Legacy ==
Tanabe was named an SRI Fellow in 1984 for his contributions to steroid hormone therapeutics, and to SRI's Alumni Hall of Fame in 2004.

Tanabe worked with many SRI post-doctoral and international fellows; in addition, 45 Japanese scientists studied under him at SRI in Menlo Park, California under SRI's academic exchange program. As a result, he was awarded the Japanese Pharmaceutical Society's Distinguished Service Award on March 27, 2001. He is the first person outside Japan to receive that award.
