= Masoala (disambiguation) =

Masoala is a genus of flowering plant in the family Arecaceae.

Masoala may also refer to:

- Masoala, Madagascar, a village in North Madagascar, on the South coast of the Masoala Peninsula
- Masoala Peninsula, in North Madagascar
- Cape Masoala, the easternmost point of Madagascar
- Masoala National Park, on the Masoala Peninsula

== See also ==
- Masoala fork-crowned lemur (Phaner furcifer)
