= Pomarose =

- (2E,5Z)-Pomarose

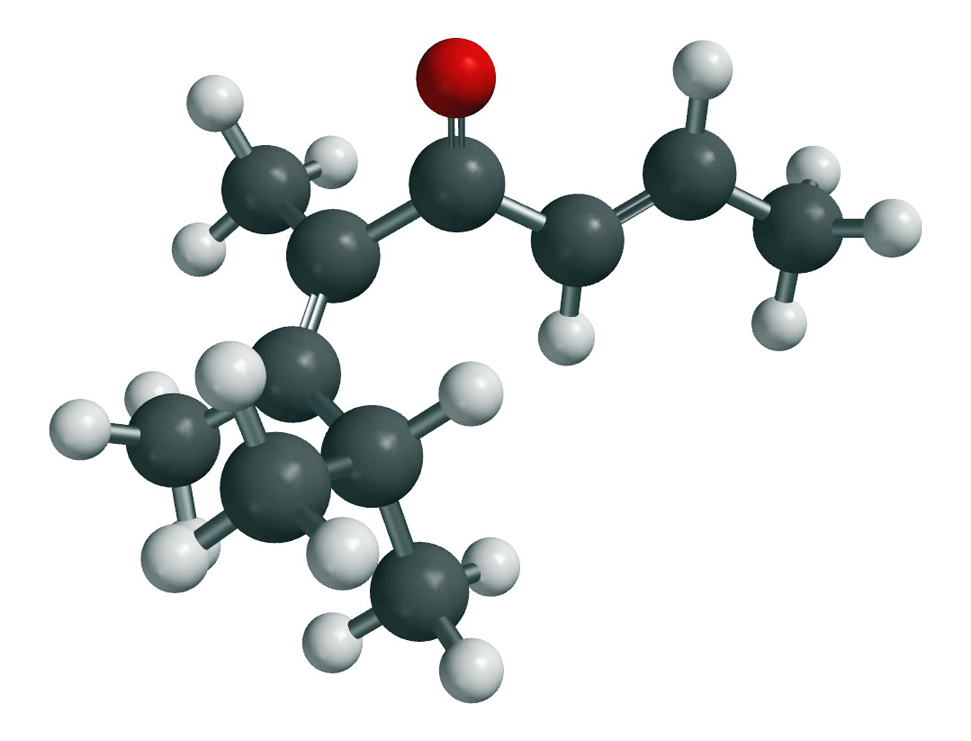

Names
- Preferred IUPAC name (2E,5Z)-5,6,7-Trimethylocta-2,5-dien-4-one

Identifiers
CAS Number	357650-26-1
3D model (JSmol)	Interactive image
ChemSpider	9205378
PubChem CID	11030204
UNII	EPU9H8QVS8
CompTox Dashboard (EPA)	DTXSID00889170
- InChI: InChI=1S/C11H18O/c1-6-7-11(12)10(5)9(4)8(2)3/h6-8H,1-5H3/b7-6+,10-9- Key: QWRGOHMKGNCVAC-KQHSAVHASA-N
- SMILES: O=C(/C(C)=C(C)\C(C)C)/C=C/C

Properties
Chemical formula	C_{11}H_{18}O
Molar mass	166.264 g·mol^{−1}
Density	0.855 g/cm^{3}
Boiling point	236.2 °C (457.2 °F; 509.3 K)
- Except where otherwise noted, data are given for materials in their standard state (at 25 °C [77 °F], 100 kPa). verify (what is ?) Infobox references

Pomarose is a high-impact captive odorant patented by Givaudan. It is a double-unsaturated ketone that does not occur in nature. Pomarose has a powerful fruity rose odor with nuances of apples, plums and raisins, which is almost entirely due to the (2E,5Z)-stereoisomer, while its (2E,5E)-isomer is barely detectable for most people. Catalyzed by traces of acids, both isomers equilibrate however quickly upon standing in glass containers.

== Discovery and synthesis ==
5,6,7-Trimethylocta-2,5-dien-4-one was suspected by Philip Kraft et al. by investigation of the NMR spectra of an unknown trace component with damascone odor in a crude complex reaction product. Although this trace component eventually turned out to be the constitutional isomer 2-methyl-3-isopropylhepta-2,5-dien-4-one. Pomarose was synthesized for structural curiosity and found to possess even superior fruity, rosy odor characteristics, reminiscent of apples, plums, raisins and other dried fruits with a low odor threshold of 0.5 ng/L air. The synthesis comprised borontrifluoride-catalyzed addition of methyl isopropyl ketone to 1-ethoxyprop-1-yne, which afforded ethyl 2,3,4-trimethylpent-2-enoate, and then was transformed into the target molecule by Grignard reaction with propen-1-ylmagnesium bromide via in situ enolization.

== Use in perfumery ==
Pomarose has been used in a variety of perfumes. It had its debut in Be Delicious for Men and it is also used in Unforgivable, 1 Million, CK free, Legend, Unforgivable Woman and John Galliano.

== Related compounds ==
- Damascones
