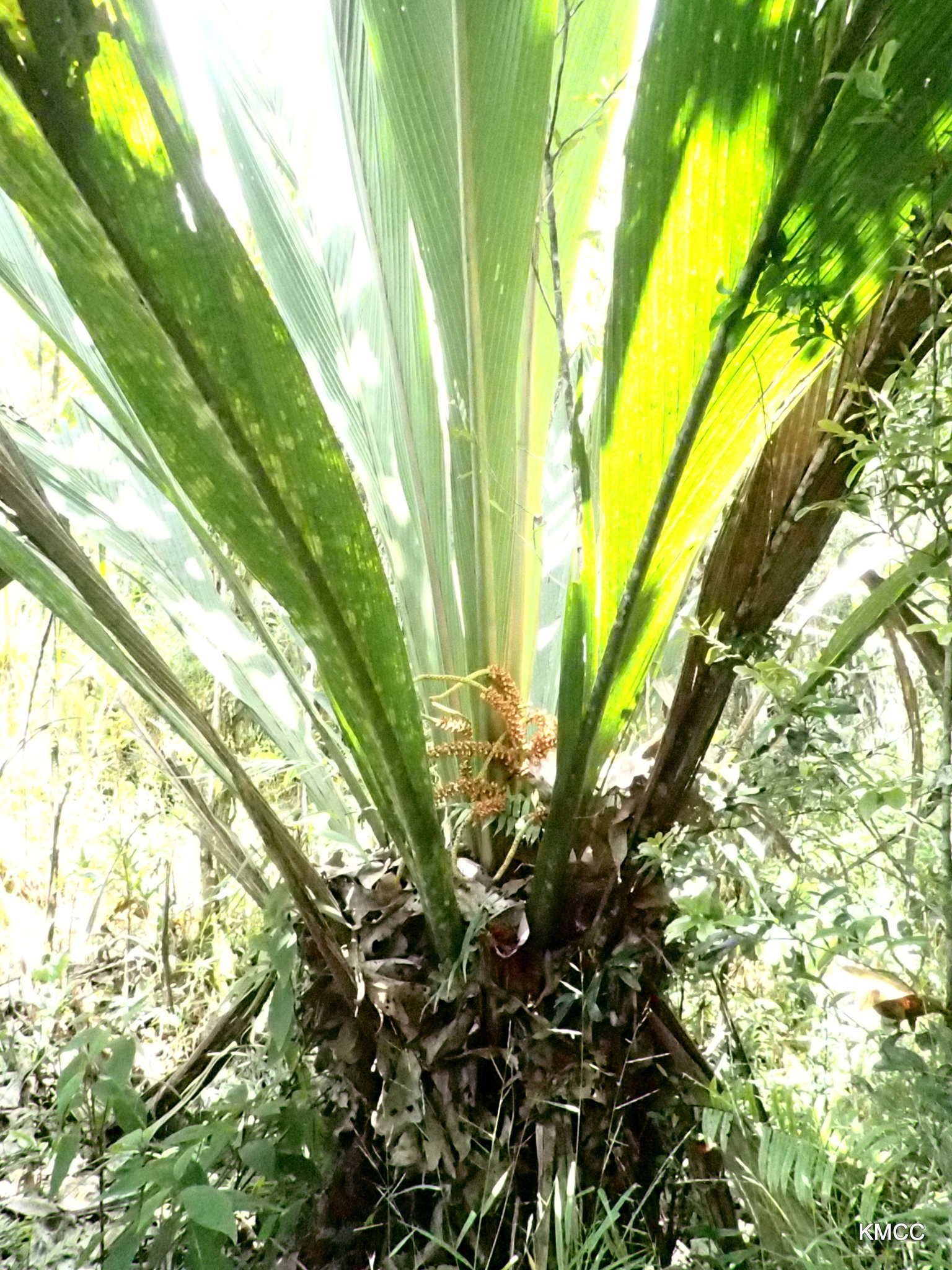

Conservation status
- Endangered (IUCN 3.1)

Scientific classification
- Kingdom: Plantae
- Clade: Embryophytes
- Clade: Tracheophytes
- Clade: Angiosperms
- Clade: Monocots
- Clade: Commelinids
- Order: Arecales
- Family: Arecaceae
- Genus: Masoala
- Species: M. kona

Binomial name
- Masoala kona Beentje

= Masoala kona =

Species of flowering plant

Masoala kona is a species of flowering plant in the palm family (Arecaceae or Palmae). It is a palm endemic to Madagascar, where it grows in rainforests. There are fewer than 60 individuals estimated to remain. Its most remarkable feature is that its leaves bear the longest "segments" of any plant; up to 8.2 feet (2.5 meters) in length. A leaf segment has a broad attachment to the rachis rather than a petiolule. It differs from a lobed leaf in that the lamina (leaf) is not continuous. The species is threatened by habitat loss.
