= Taiho Pharmaceutical =

Japanese pharmaceutical company

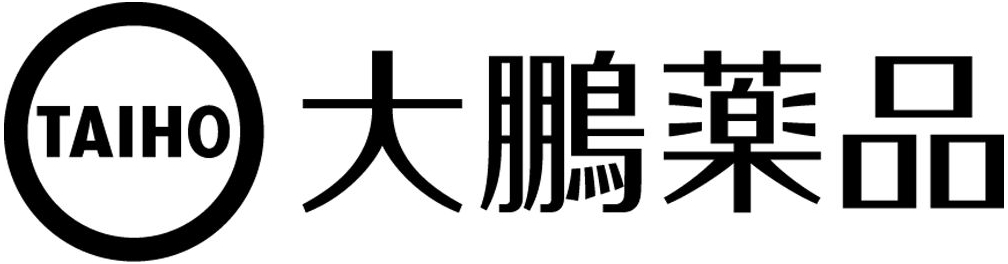

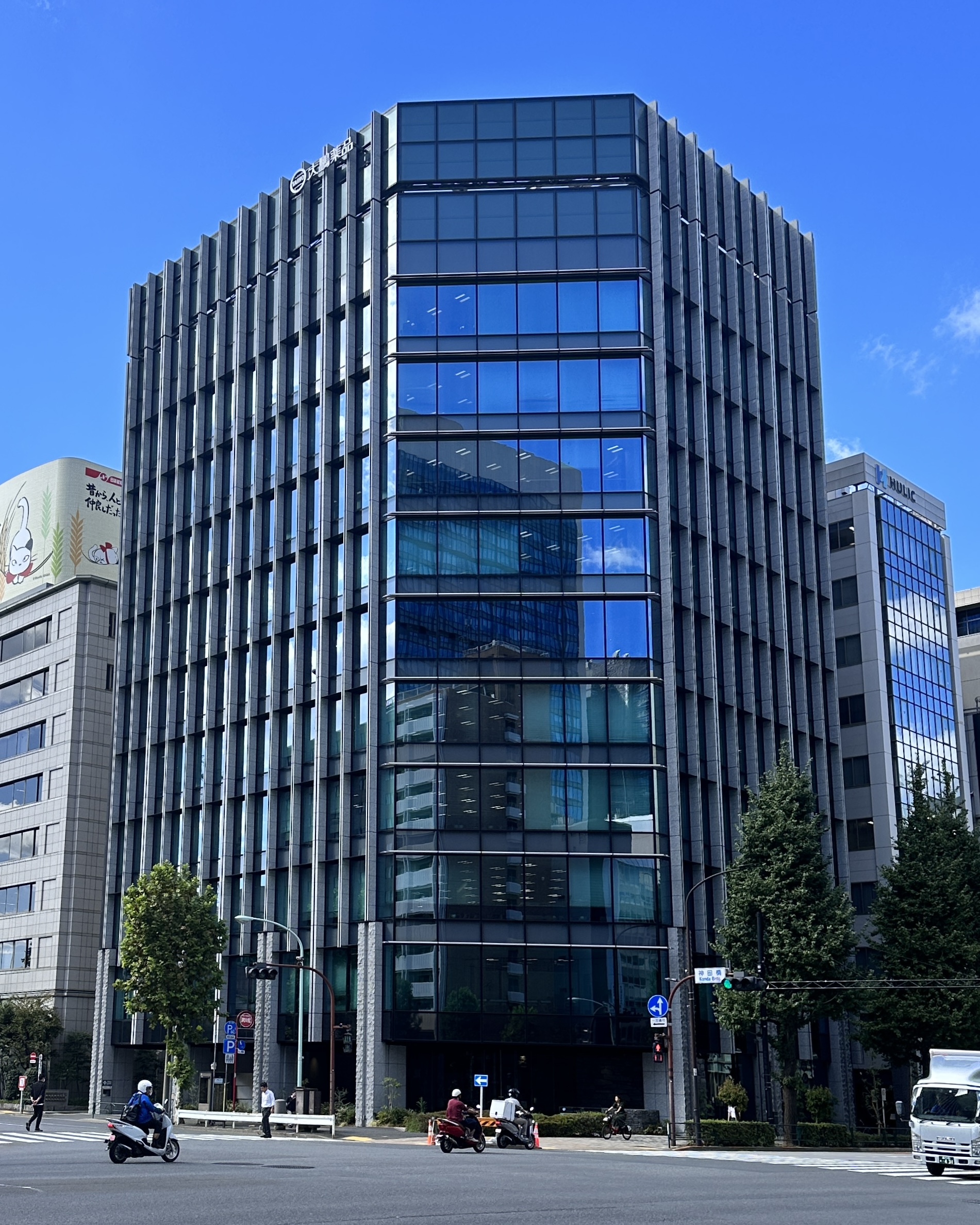
- Headquarters in Kanda-Nishikichō, Chiyoda, Tokyo
- Type: Limited company
- Industry: Pharmaceuticals
- Founded: June 1, 1963; 63 years ago
- Headquarters: Tokyo, Japan
- Products: Cancer treatments
- Number of employees: 2500 (2013)
- Parent: Otsuka Holdings
- Website: Taiho Corporate Site (English)

Taiho Pharmaceutical Co., Ltd. (大鵬薬品工業, Taihō Yakuhin Kōgyō) is a Japanese pharmaceutical company, and a subsidiary of Otsuka Holdings, which focuses on developing cancer treatments. Taiho, headquartered in Tokyo, Japan, is an R&D-driven specialty pharma focusing on the three fields of oncology, allergies and immunology, and urology.

Being Japan's second-largest pharmaceutical company by prescription oral oncology sales, Taiho covers oncology related therapeutic areas including stomach cancer, colorectal cancer, pancreatic cancer, and breast cancer. Taiho also engages in research and development, manufacturing, and the marketing of pharmaceutical products. The company is principally active in the prescription market, but also develops over-the-counter medication, and is a full member of the Japan Pharmaceutical Manufacturers Association (JPMA).

As of March 2013, Taiho had over 2,500 employees worldwide. The company achieved approximately US$1.3 billion in revenue during the 2012 fiscal year.

== History ==
1963 — Taiho Pharmaceutical Co., Ltd. established; Yukio Kobayashi appointed as president and representative director. Capital increased to ¥100 million A representative from each of the 49 distributors nationwide assumes the position of Board Member

1964 — In-house production plant established in Naruto, Tokushima Prefecture Nine new offices established throughout Japan, centered around the head office in Tokyo, as sales bases

1965 — Capital increased from ¥100 to ¥200 million

1969 — License with the Soviet Union to introduce Futraful in Japan

1971 — Lyophilized formulation plant (seventh plant) completed in the Imagire Industrial Park in Tokushima

1974 — Proprietary Medicine Division established

1975 — Advertising strategy (TV ads) started for Tiovita Drink

1976 — Business alliance formed with Nichiban Co., Ltd., with equity participation by Taiho Pharmaceutical

1977 — Employee welfare facility Otsuka Amagi Mountain Villa completed

1978 — Business alliance formed with Kotai Kasei Co., Ltd., with equity participation by Taiho Pharmaceutical GMP-compliant injection drug plant completed within the Tokushima Plant; full plant integration also completed

1979 — Advertising strategy (TV ads) started for Solmack

1980 — GLP-compliant Tokushima Research and Development Laboratory and Safety Laboratory completed in Tokushima

1985 — 100% Taiho-financed Kotai Kasei head office plant completed; Kodama Laboratory set up on the plant premises

1986 — Head office moved to new building in Kanda, Chiyoda-ku, Tokyo State-of-the-art factory automation plant completed at Tokushima Plant

1987 — Synphar Laboratory established in Alberta, Canada 25th Anniversary Ceremony held in Tokyo and Tokushima Akihiko Otsuka becomes chairman and representative director

1989 — Formulation Research Laboratory completed

1990 — Drug Discovery Center, Seminar and Training Center, and Computer Center completed in Saitama Taiho Pharmaceutical purchases equity and participates in management of Shinsen Iyaku Co., Ltd.

1991 — Okayama Plant completed

1992 — 30th Anniversary Ceremony held in Tokyo Name of Shinsen Iyaku Co., Ltd. changed to Okayama Taiho Pharmaceutical Co., Ltd. President Yukio Kobayashi awarded honorary doctorate by the University of Alberta in Canada Kotai Kasei changed name to Taiho Fine Chemical

1994 — President Yukio Kobayashi awarded Japan's prestigious Medal with Yellow Ribbon

1995 — Taiho Fine Chemical merges with Taiho Pharmaceutical and starts operating as Saitama Plant President Yukio Kobayashi awarded the GreenDex Award by the Republic of Latvia

1996 — Collaborative research agreement signed for breast cancer therapeutics with SRI International (US)

1997 — Japanese and international GMP-compliant plant for new investigational drugs opens Clinical Research USA Office established in New York

1998 — Collaborative research and development agreement for angiogenesis inhibitor signed with Sugen, Inc. (U.S.A.)

1999 — Yukio Kobayashi, president and representative director of Taiho Pharmaceutical, becomes president and representative director of Otsuka Pharmaceutical Co., Ltd.

2000 — President Yukio Kobayashi becomes advisor to Otsuka Pharmaceutical

2001 — Yukio Kobayashi becomes chairman and representative director of Taiho Pharmaceutical Toru Usami becomes president and representative director of Taiho Pharmaceutical

2002 — Company History published in commemoration of the 40th Anniversary Taiho Pharma U.S.A., Inc. established in New Jersey in the U.S.

2003 — Marketing approval for TS-1 obtained in South Korea Inuyama Plant in Aichi Prefecture starts operations

2004 — Taiho Pharmaceutical signs a licensing agreement for new antiemetic palonosetron with Helsinn Healthcare SA (Switzerland) Research results on UFT adjuvant therapy for lung cancer published in The New England Journal of Medicine (NEJM) Collaboration agreement in oncology signed with the University of Tokushima

2005 — Taiho Pharmaceutical signs a licensing agreement for anticancer agent Abraxane with American BioSciences Inc.

2007 — Annex to the head office completed Taiho Pharmaceutical holds a ceremony for the 45th anniversary of its founding in Tokyo Tenth plant newly established to manufacture anticancer granules and investigational drugs Data on TS-1 adjuvant therapy for gastric cancer published in NEJM

2008 — Otsuka Holdings established Results of a phase III trial on combination chemotherapy of TS-1 and cisplatin for advanced gastric cancer (SPIRITS) published in UK medical journal The Lancet Oncology Taiho Pharmaceutical of Beijing Co., Ltd., established

2009 — Marketing approval for TS-1 obtained in China Results of adjuvant chemotherapy for breast cancer treatment with UFT (N-SAS-BC01) published in the US's Journal of Clinical Oncology (JCO) Taiho Pharmaceutical and PharmaMar (Spain) enter into a license agreement on anticancer agent, Yondelis Taiho History Museum completed at the Tokushima Plant Marketing approval obtained in Singapore for TS-ONE (TS-1) Taho Pharmaceutical acquires Tsukuba Research Institute from Banyu Pharmaceutical Co., Ltd

2010 — Research results from the FIRIS Study published in the electronic version of The Lancet Oncology Marketing approval for TS-1 obtained in Taiwan Research results for TS-1 on non-small cell lung cancer published in the digital version of the US's Journal of Clinical Oncology (JCO)

2011 — TS-1 approved in the EU as a treatment for advanced gastric cancer Taiho Pharmaceutical signs a licensing agreement on a new antiemetic combination agent with Helsinn Healthcare S.A. Taiho Pharmaceutical signs a distribution agreement with MSD K.K. for the anticancer compound vorinostat in Japan Taiho Pharmaceutical signs a co-development and commercialization agreement with Nordic Group BV for Teysuno in Europe Arrangements committee of European representative office established

2012 — Marketing approval for TS-ONE obtained in Thailand Marketing of Teysuno begins in Europe Masayuki Kobayashi becomes president and representative director Marketing approval for TS-ONE obtained in Hong Kong Marketing approval for TS-ONE obtained in Malaysia License agreement for anti-allergy drug bilastine signed with Spain-based Faes Farma S.A.

2013 — Research results on TS-1 against advanced cancer published in the digital edition of the Journal of Clinical Oncology (JCO) Kitajima Plant completed in Tokushima Prefecture

== Parent Company ==
Otsuka Holdings Co., Ltd. The Otsuka Group is a global organization of 156 healthcare companies with approximately 40,000 employees. Otsuka Holdings Co., Ltd., is the Group's holding company. The main operating companies are Otsuka Pharmaceutical Co., Ltd.; Otsuka Pharmaceutical Factory, Inc.; Taiho Pharmaceutical Co., Ltd.; Otsuka Warehouse Co., Ltd.; and Otsuka Chemical Co., Ltd.

== Affiliated Companies ==
- Nichiban
- OKAYAMA TAIHO Pharmaceutical Co., Ltd.

== Sponsored Drugs of Note ==
TAS-108 is under development by SRI International.

== See also ==
- Biotech and pharmaceutical companies in the New York metropolitan area
