= TAS-108 =

Chemical compound

Clinical data
- Other names: 17β-[2-[4-[(diethylamino)methyl]-2-methoxyphenoxy]ethyl]-7α-methylestra-1,3,5(10)-trien-3-ol; 17β-[2-[4-[(diethylamino)methyl]-2-methoxyphenoxy]ethyl]-7α-methylestradiol
- Routes of administration: By mouth
- ATC code: L02BA (WHO)

Identifiers
- IUPAC name: (1S,9R,10S,11S,14R,15R)-14-(2-{4-[(diethylamino)methyl]-2-methoxyphenoxy}ethyl)-9,15-dimethyltetracyclo[8.7.0.0^{2,7}.0^{11,15}]heptadeca-2(7),3,5-trien-5-ol
- CAS Number: 229634-97-3; Citrate: 229634-98-4
- PubChem CID: 9874875; Citrate: 9874874
- ChemSpider: 8050564; Citrate: 8050563
- UNII: 42U0C8VOLO; Citrate: 9B29N23K7E
- CompTox Dashboard (EPA): DTXSID601117925

Chemical and physical data
- Formula: C_{33}H_{47}NO_{3}
- Molar mass: 505.743 g·mol^{−1}
- 3D model (JSmol): Interactive image; Citrate: Interactive image
- SMILES: CCN(CC)CC1=CC(=C(C=C1)OCC[C@H]2CC[C@@H]3[C@@]2(CC[C@H]4[C@H]3[C@@H](CC5=C4C=CC(=C5)O)C)C)OC; Citrate: CCN(CC)CC1=CC(=C(C=C1)OCC[C@H]2CC[C@@H]3[C@@]2(CC[C@H]4[C@H]3[C@@H](CC5=C4C=CC(=C5)O)C)C)OC.C(C(=O)O)C(CC(=O)O)(C(=O)O)O
- InChI: InChI=1S/C33H47NO3/c1-6-34(7-2)21-23-8-13-30(31(19-23)36-5)37-17-15-25-9-12-29-32-22(3)18-24-20-26(35)10-11-27(24)28(32)14-16-33(25,29)4/h8,10-11,13,19-20,22,25,28-29,32,35H,6-7,9,12,14-18,21H2,1-5H3/t22-,25-,28-,29+,32-,33-/m1/s1; Key:OHCPNHFLPCVWRG-MWSJHZLTSA-N; Citrate: InChI=1S/C33H47NO3.C6H8O7/c1-6-34(7-2)21-23-8-13-30(31(19-23)36-5)37-17-15-25-9-12-29-32-22(3)18-24-20-26(35)10-11-27(24)28(32)14-16-33(25,29)4;7-3(8)1-6(13,5(11)12)2-4(9)10/h8,10-11,13,19-20,22,25,28-29,32,35H,6-7,9,12,14-18,21H2,1-5H3;13H,1-2H2,(H,7,8)(H,9,10)(H,11,12)/t22-,25-,28-,29+,32-,33-;/m1./s1; Key:VOHOCSJONOJOSD-SCIDSJFVSA-N

TAS-108, also known as SR-16234, is a drug discovered by Masato Tanabe and under development by SRI International and Taiho Pharmaceutical. It is a steroid hormone that has shown signs of treating and preventing breast cancer, even in patients where tamoxifen has failed.

== Development ==
Masato Tanabe's team at SRI has focused on the development of steroid hormones. A compound discovered in a previous SRI contract from the National Institutes of Health showed potential – it acted like "anti-estrogen" in the breasts and uterus but like normal estrogen elsewhere in the body, and was more "tissue-selective". A contract was proposed to Taiho Pharmaceutical in July 1996, and within six years and slightly under $3 million (an unusually short amount of time), two new drugs were discovered and tested on people (particularly people for which tamoxifen has failed): SR-16234 and SR-16287.

The first of those, SR-16234, also inhibited the growth of blood vessels angiogenesis and accelerated the death of cancer cells apoptosis and thus was particularly well suited to be an anti-cancer drug. As of August 2010, the drug had been through five Phase I and two Phase II studies, and Phase III studies are being planned.

== See also ==
- Cytestrol acetate
- Fulvestrant
- ICI-164384
