= Günther Ohloff =

German chemist (1924–2005)

- Born: 21 July 1924; Tapiau, East Prussia (present-day Germany)
- Died: 9 November 2005 (aged 81); Bernex, Switzerland
- Education: University of Königsberg; Erlangen; Technische Hochschule Dresden
- Scientific career
- Doctoral advisor: Heinrich Wienhaus
- Military career
- Allegiance: Nazi Germany
- Battles / wars: World War II

Günther Ohloff (21 July 1924 in Tapiau near Königsberg – 9 November 2005 in Bernex near Geneva) was a prominent German fragrance chemist.

== Life ==
Ohloff was raised in East Prussia. When World War II erupted, he served in the German military, serving on the Eastern Front. He was severely wounded during the Battle of Stalingrad. After the war he studied Pharmacy at the University of Königsberg and Erlangen, as well as Chemistry at the Technische Hochschule Dresden. He received a PhD in 1951, based on his work on the condensation of terpenes with formaldehyde (Prins reaction) unter the direction of Heinrich Wienhaus.

== Career ==
Ohloff began his career in 1951 with Schimmel & Co. in Miltitz near Leipzig, at that time the most renowned flavor and fragrance company. In 1953 he left Eastern Germany to take a position with Dragoco, Holzminden. In 1959 he was offered a position at the Max Planck Institute for Bioinorganic Chemistry in Mülheim with Günther Otto Schenck. There he worked on the industrial-scale application of photooxygenation reactions employing singlet oxygen, ene reactions and sigmatropic rearrangements. Ohloff returned to Industry in 1962, joining Firmenich in Geneva to head the process-research group. He was named the firm's research director and member of the board of directors in 1968, which he remained until his retirement in 1989.

Ohloff's scientific work, which is documented in 228 publications and 111 patents, centered around the structure elucidation and reactivity of terpenes, the industrial syntheses of odorants, and structure–odor correlations. He was the leading expert of empirical odor rules that predict the olfactory properties of new compounds, such as the "triaxial rule of ambergris sensation". He co-discovered the Eschenmoser fragmentation, thus sometimes referred to Eschenmoser–Ohloff fragmentation. His small but condensed magnum opus on the chemistry of odorants "Riechstoffe und Geruchssinn. Die molekulare Welt der Düfte" was republished in English in 2011, completely revised and much extended by Wilhelm Pickenhagen and Philip Kraft, as "Scent and Chemistry – The Molecular World of Odors".

== Awards ==
- Leopold Ružička Award of the Swiss Chemical Society (1967)
- Ernest Guenther Award of the American Chemical Society (1974)
- Hackford Jones Prize of the British Society of Perfumery (1980)
- Otto-Wallach-Medal of the Gesellschaft Deutscher Chemiker (1981)
- R. H. Wright Award of the Simon Fraser University, Canada (1988)

== Books ==
- Günther Ohloff: Riechstoffe und Geruchssinn. Die molekulare Welt der Düfte, Springer, Berlin, 1990, ISBN 3-540-52560-2. English translation: Scent and Fragrances: The Fascination of Odors and Their Chemical Perspectives, Springer, New York, 1994, ISBN 0-387-57108-6
- Günther Ohloff: Irdische Düfte, himmlische Lust, Birkhäuser, Basel, 2000, ISBN 3-7643-2753-7. English translation projected with Verlag Helvetica Chimica Acta, Zürich, for 2012
- Günther Ohloff: Düfte – Signale der Gefühlswelt, Verlag Helvetica Chimica Acta, Zurich, 2004, ISBN 978-3-906390-30-7
- Günther Ohloff, Wilhelm Pickenhagen, Philip Kraft: "Scent and Chemistry – The Molecular World of Odors", Verlag Helvetica Chimica Acta, Zurich, 2011, ISBN 978-3-906390-66-6
