= Electrofuge =

Chemical leaving group which does not retain the electrons from its prior bond

In chemistry, an electrofuge is a leaving group that does not retain the lone pair of electrons from its previous bond with another species (in contrast to a nucleofuge, which does). It can result from the heterolytic breaking of covalent bonds. After this reaction an electrofuge may possess either a positive or a neutral charge; this is governed by the nature of the specific reaction.

An example would be the loss of H^{+} from a molecule of benzene during nitration.

The word 'electrofuge' is frequently found in older literature, but its use in contemporary organic chemistry is now uncommon.

== See also ==
- Nucleofuge — counterpart retaining electrons
- Nucleophile and electrophile — analogous entering groups
- Reductive elimination — similar process with metal complexes, but with two single-electron electrofuges
- Carbenium ion — common non-metal electrofuges, with assessment of relative stability
- Fragmentation (mass spectrometry) — often an electrofugal process
