= Nucleofuge =

Chemical leaving group

In chemistry, a nucleofuge (from nucleo- 'atomic nucleus' and fuge 'to run away/escape') is a leaving group which retains the lone pair of electrons from its previous bond with another species. For example, in the S_{N}2 mechanism, a nucleophile attacks an organic compound containing the nucleofuge (the bromo group) which simultaneously breaks the bond with the nucleofuge.

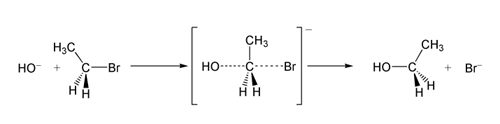
SN2 reaction of bromoethane with hydroxide ion

After a reaction nucleofuges may contain either a negative or a neutral charge; this is governed by the nature of the specific reaction.

The word 'nucleofuge' is commonly found in older literature, but its use is less common in current literature in which the term leaving group dominates.

== See also ==
- Electrofuge
- Nucleophile
- Electrophile
