= Abidi alkyne synthesis =

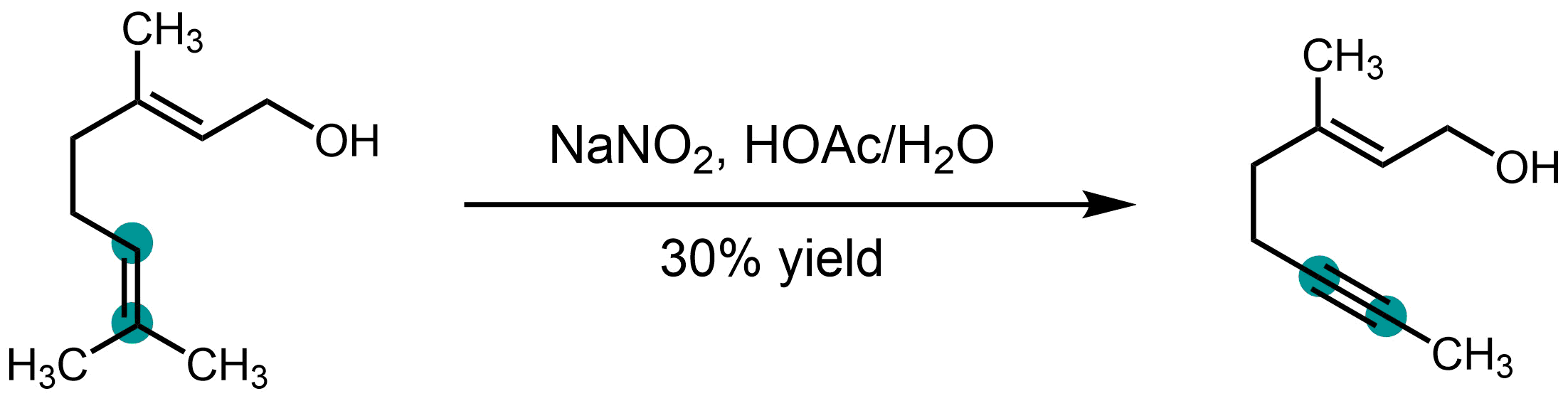
The Abidi alkyne synthesis on geraniol as the starting material.

In organic chemistry, the Abidi alkyne synthesis or the Abidi transformation is an organic reaction whereby an 1,1-dimethyl-2-alkyl substituted alkene (i.e., an isopropylidene olefin) is converted by sodium nitrite in acetic acid/water solvent to give a methyl alkyl alkyne through the net loss of a hydrogen atom and a methyl group, the elements of methane. It is therefore described as a demethanation. The reaction was first reported in 1985 as a serendipitous finding by S. L. Abidi, an analytical chemist at the National Fishery Research Laboratory (then part of the US Fish and Wildlife Service) in La Crosse, Wisconsin.

The highly unusual transformation provoked considerable interest in its mechanism, which was subsequently studied by the groups of E. J. Corey and Samir Zard. The key intermediate is believed to be an allylic nitro compound, which undergoes further nitrosylation and cyclization steps. The methyl group is believed to be ultimately lost as CO_{2}. However, only a broad outline of the latter steps of the mechanism is currently known.

It has been applied towards a number of total syntheses.
