= Captodative effect =

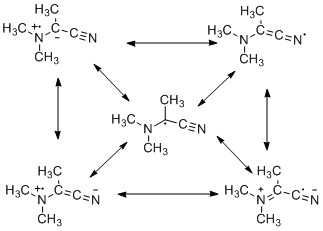
Resonance contributors of the 2-(dimethylamino)propanenitrile free radical, adapted from Anslyn

The captodative effect is the stabilization of radicals by a synergistic effect of an electron-withdrawing substituent and an electron-donating substituent. The name originates as the electron-withdrawing group (EWG) is sometimes called the "captor" group, whilst the electron-donating group (EDG) is the "dative" substituent. Olefins with this substituent pattern are sometime described as captodative. Radical reactions play an integral role in several chemical reactions and are also important to the field of polymer science.

When EDGs and EWGs are near the radical center, the stability of the radical center increases. The substituents can kinetically stabilize radical centers by preventing molecules and other radical centers from reacting with the center. The substituents thermodynamically stabilize the center by delocalizing the radical ion via resonance. These stabilization mechanisms lead to an enhanced rate for free-radicals that have these sorts of intermediates or transition states. In the figure at right, the radical is delocalized between the captor nitrile (-CN), and the dative secondary amine (-N(CH_{3})_{2}), thus stabilizing the radical center. The stability of carbene radicals and carbene radical ligands has been rationalized and quantified by the captodative effect using the Klopman–Salem equation.

== Substituent effect on reaction rates ==
Certain substituents are better at stabilizing radical centers than others. This is influenced by the substituent's ability to delocalize the radical ion in the transition state structure. Delocalizing the radical ion stabilizes the transition state structure. As a result, the energy of activation decreases, enhancing the rate of the overall reaction. According to the captodative effect, the rate of a reaction is the greatest when both the EDG and EWG are able to delocalize the radical ion in the transition state structure.

Ito and co-workers observed the rate of addition reactions of aryl thiol radical to disubstituted olefins. The olefins contained an EWG nitrile group and varying EDGs and the effect of varying EDGs on the rate of the addition reactions was observed. The process studied was:

The rate of the addition reaction was accelerated by the following EDGs in increasing order: H < CH_{3} < OCH_{2}CH_{3}. When R = OCH_{2}CH_{3}, the rate of the reaction is the fastest because the reaction has the smallest energy of activation (ΔG^{‡}). The ethoxy and cyano groups are able to delocalize the radical ion in the transition state, thus stabilizing the radical center. The rate enhancement is due to the captodative effect. When R = H, the reaction has the largest energy of activation because the radical center is not stabilized by the captodative effect. The hydrogen atom is not able to delocalize the radical ion. Thus, the reaction is slow relative to the R = OCH_{2}CH_{3} case. When R = CH_{3}, the rate of the reaction is faster relative to when R = H because methyl groups have more electron donating capability. However, the reaction rate is slower relative to when R = OCH_{2}CH_{3} because the radical ion is not delocalized over the methyl group . Thus, the captodative does not influence the reaction rate if the radical ion is not delocalized onto both the EWG and EDG substituents. Each of these cases is illustrated below:

== Uses in synthesis ==
The term "captodative ethylenes" has been used in the context of cycloaddition reactions involving captodative radical intermediates – for example, the thermal [2+2] head-to-head dimerization of 2-methylthioacrylonitrile occurs readily at room temperature; formation of the equivalent cyclobutane derivative of acrylonitrile is "sluggish". Intramolecular [2+2] cyclizations have also been reported to be enhanced by captodative effects, as shown below:

Similar effects have been discussed for other cycloadditions such as [3+2], [4+2], and [3+4] for captodative ethylenes. Effects have also been reported in cases like Diels-Alder and Friedel-Crafts reactions in cases where nucleophilic olefins react inefficiently, attributed to the transition state being close to a biradical and thus stabilized. These studies have revealed a direct dependence on Δω, difference in electrophilicity, and the polar nature of the reaction. They have been used because of their highly reactive, stereoselective, regioselective nature within these reactions.

Captodative olefins in reactions also show interfering effects with the typical kinetic isotope effect, allowing atypical reactions to occur with isotope-labeled molecules and demonstrating that the mechanisms and transition states of these reactions have been influenced.

== Polymer science application ==
Free-radical polymerization, where radicals are the chain carriers in the propagation of the process, accounted for 40 billion of the 110 billion pounds of polymers produced in the United States in 2001. Captodative olefins have a specific advantage of being responsive to solvent effects without the effect of destabilizing the radical. They have also shown to undergo their radical transformation spontaneously which allows them to be useful in polymerization mechanism elucidation and better understood through NMR Studies. Furthermore, captodative ethanes are initiators with unique properties giving higher molecular weight distribution and forming block copolymers through the known radical mechanisms. The polymers obtained from captodatively substituted starting materials exhibit "desirable" properties such as optical activity, differences in polarity, solvent affinity, thermal and mechanical stabilities.

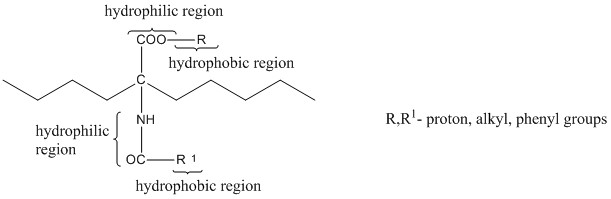
Substituents on the monomer can affect solvent affinities

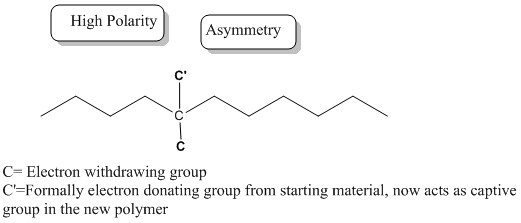
How a captodative monomer can form a polar polymer

1. Polymers with polar substituents are known to have interesting applications including within electrical and optical materials.
2. These polymers are typically transparent.
3. The T_{di} (initial decomposition) of these polymers are relatively low compared to their analogues, but have relatively higher T_{dm} (maximum rate of weight change temperatures). Meaning although they will start to melt quicker, they will take longer to fully change phases.
4. Polymers with large captodative stabilizations starting materials can quickly "unzip" to their starting monomer upon heating.
5. Bifunctional polymers, with two different functional groups at every monomer unit, are commonly formed from the captodative monomers.
  1. Dative groups substantially alter the solubility through Hydrogen bonding in specific bifunctional polymers( see figure above). However no clear correlation has been developed at this time, since not all combinations of substituents and solubilities have been investigated.
6. Captodative polymer is highly functional in chelates with certain metals.
