= Leaving group =

Atom(s) that detach from the substrate during a chemical reaction

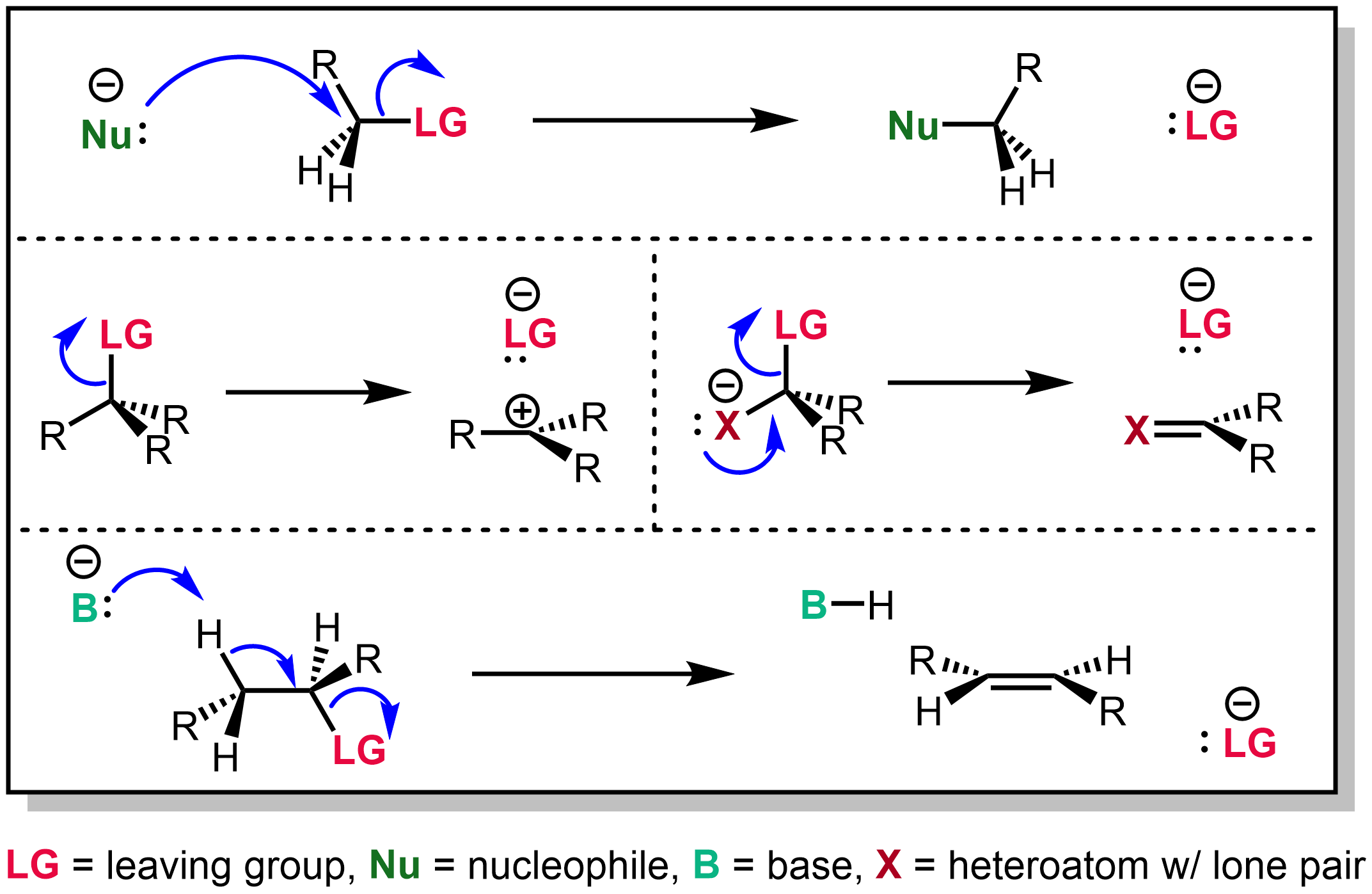
Common mechanistic contexts that involve the departure of a nucleofugal leaving group. The leaving group (LG) is shown in red. Top: S_{N}2 reaction; middle/left: first step of S_{N}1 and E1 reactions; middle/right: second step of E1cb, A_{AC}2, and B_{AC}2 reactions; bottom: E2 reaction.

In organic chemistry, a leaving group typically means a molecular fragment that departs with an electron pair during a reaction step with heterolytic bond cleavage. In this usage, a leaving group is a less formal but more commonly used synonym of the term nucleofuge; although IUPAC gives the term a broader definition.

A species' ability to serve as a leaving group can affect whether a reaction proceeds at a meaningful rate, as well as what mechanism the reaction takes.

Leaving group ability depends strongly on context, but correlates with ability to stabilize additional electron density from bond heterolysis. Common anionic leaving groups are Cl^{−}, Br^{−} and I^{−} halides and sulfonate esters such as tosylate (TsO^{−}). Water (H_{2}O), alcohols (R−OH), and amines (R_{3}N) are common neutral leaving groups. Some moieties, such as hydride (H^{−}) serve as leaving groups only extremely rarely.

== Nomenclature ==
IUPAC defines a leaving group to be any group of atoms that detaches from the main substrate during a reaction step. The term thus includes groups that depart without an electron pair in a heterolytic cleavage (electrofuges), like H^{+} or SiR^{+}_{3}, which commonly depart in electrophilic aromatic substitution reactions. Similarly, species of high thermodynamic stability like nitrogen (N_{2}) or carbon dioxide (CO_{2}) commonly act as leaving groups in homolytic bond cleavage reactions of radical species.

In organic chemistry, the term leaving group is rarely used for such species, being restricted only to nucleofugal leaving groups. Leaving groups are generally anions or neutral species, departing from neutral or cationic substrates, respectively, though in rare cases, cations leaving from a dicationic substrate are also known.

This article follows the organic chemistry convention.

== Overview ==
Leaving group ability manifests physically in a fast reaction rate. Equivalently, reactions involving good leaving groups have low activation barriers and relatively stable transition states. Because different reaction mechanisms have different transition states, leaving group ability depends on the reaction in question.

For example, consider the first step of an S_{N}1 or E1 reaction in neutral media: ionization, with an anionic leaving group.

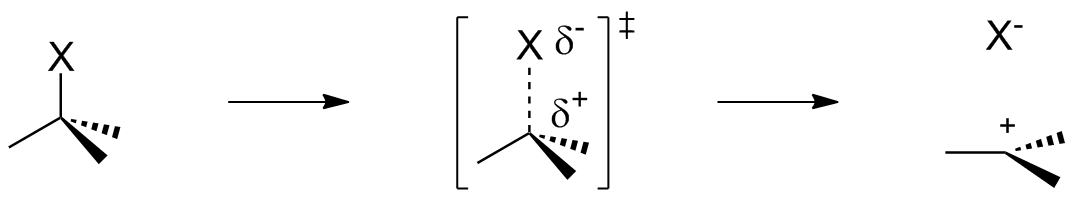
In an ionization reaction, as in all reactions that involve leaving group departure, the leaving group bears a larger negative charge in the transition state and products than it does in the starting materials

Because the leaving group gains negative charge in the transition state (and products), a good leaving group must stabilize this negative charge and form a stable anion. Strong bases such as OH^{−}, OR^{−} and NR^{−}_{2} tend to make poor leaving groups, as they cannot stabilize further negative charge; whereas extremely weak bases, such as OSO_{2}CH^{−}_{3}, leave easily. As such, leaving groups typically exhibit correlation between their reactivity and the dissociation constant for their conjugate acid (pK_{aH}).

The correlation between leaving group ability and pK_{aH} is not perfect. Leaving group ability is a kinetic phenomenon, so it reflects the difference between the energy of a transition state and reactants (ΔG^{‡}). Acidity is a thermodynamic phenomenon reflecting energy difference between products and reactants (ΔG). Additionally, the bonds being broken are different: loss of a leaving group breaks a bond to (usually) carbon, and ionization of an acid breaks a bond to hydrogen.

Many organic chemistry textbooks offer a table comparing typical leaving groups' ability across common reactions:

Leaving groups ordered approximately in decreasing ability to leave
R−N^{+}_{2}	dinitrogen
R−OR'^{+}_{2}	dialkyl ether
R−OSO_{2}R^{F}	perfluoroalkylsulfonates (e.g. triflate)
R–I	iodide
R–OTs, R–OMs, etc.	tosylates, mesylates and similar sulfonates
R–Br	bromide
R−OH^{+}_{2}, R'−OHR^{+}	water, alcohols
R–Cl	chloride
R−ONO_{2}, R−OPO(OR')_{2}	nitrate, phosphate, and other inorganic esters
R−SR'^{+}_{2}	thioether
R−NR'^{+}_{3}, R−NH^{+}_{3}	amines, ammonia
R–F	fluoride
R–OCOR	carboxylate
R–OAr	phenoxides
R–OH, R–OR	hydroxide, alkoxides
R–NR_{2}	amides
R–H	hydride
R–R'	arenide, alkanide

It is exceedingly rare for groups such as H^{−} (hydrides), R_{3}C^{−} (alkyl anions, R = alkyl or H), or Ar^{−} (aryl anions, Ar = aryl) to depart with a pair of electrons because of the high energy of these species. The Chichibabin reaction provides an example of hydride as a leaving group, while the Wolff-Kishner reaction and Haller-Bauer reaction feature unstabilized carbanion leaving groups.

=== Context-dependence ===
For reactions with a different transition state, other aspects of the leaving group may govern. In acid-catalyzed reactions' rate-determining step, adducts between the formal leaving group and the acid catalyst depart. In those cases, leaving group ability correlates with bond strength to the catalyst (see § Leaving group activation).

In S_{N}Ar reactions, the rate is generally increased when the leaving group is fluoride relative to the other halogens. This effect is due to the fact that the highest energy transition state for this two step addition-elimination process occurs in the first step, where fluoride's greater electron withdrawing capability relative to the other halides stabilizes the developing negative charge on the aromatic ring. The departure of the leaving group takes place quickly from this high energy Meisenheimer complex, and since the departure is not involved in the rate limiting step, it does not affect the overall rate of the reaction.

Even for the same reaction mechanism in the same media, relative reactivity of a leaving group may depend on the other reagents. In the substitutions tabulated below, ethoxide displaces tosylate faster than any halide, but para-thiocresolate displaces iodide and even bromide faster than tosylate.

Relative rates for leaving groups (k_{X}/k_{Br}) in each reaction
Leaving group (X)		
Cl	0.0074	0.0024 (at 40 °C)
Br	1	1
I	3.5	1.9
OTs	0.44	3.6

== S_{N}2 reactions ==
For S_{N}2 reactions, typical synthetically-useful leaving groups include Cl^{−}, Br^{−}, I^{−}, ^{−}OTs, ^{−}OMs, ^{−}OTf, and H_{2}O. Phosphate and carboxylate substrates are more likely to react by competitive addition-elimination, while sulfonium and ammonium salts generally form ylides or undergo E2 elimination. Phenoxides (^{−}OAr) constitute the lower limit for feasible S_{N}2 leaving groups: very strong nucleophiles like Ph_{2}P^{−} or EtS^{−} demethylate anisole derivatives through S_{N}2 displacement at the methyl group. Hydroxide, alkoxides, amides, hydride, and alkyl anions do not serve as leaving groups in S_{N}2 reactions.

== Base eliminations ==
When anionic or dianionic tetrahedral intermediates collapse, the high electron density of the neighboring heteroatom facilitates the expulsion of even a very poor leaving group. This dramatic departure occurs because forming a very strong C=O double-bond can drive an otherwise unfavorable reaction forward. For example, even amides expulse R_{2}N^{−}, an extremely poor leaving group, in nucleophilic acyl substitution.

This elimination of poor leaving groups also extends to conjugate base eliminations. Many E1cb reactions (e.g. the aldol condensation) commonly involve a hydroxide leaving group from an enolate β position.

=== E1cb reactions ===
E1cb reactions proceed with poor leaving groups, but because the C=C double bond is weaker than a C=O bond, the leaving group affects the elimination mechanism.

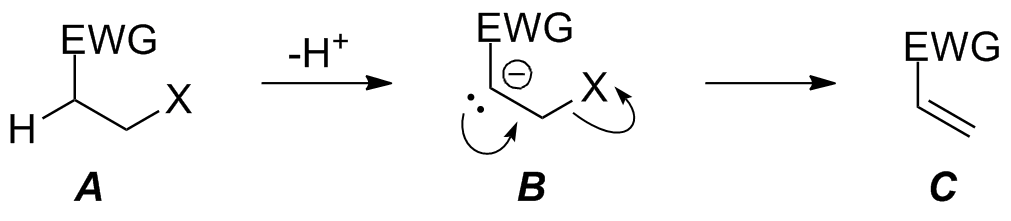

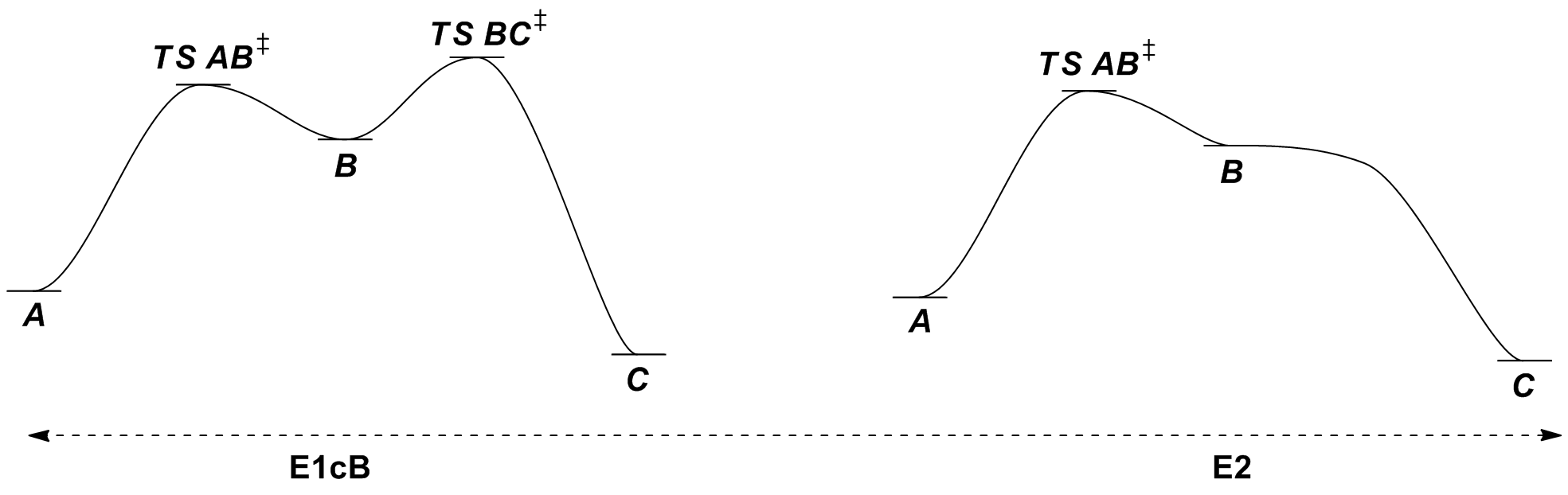

Poor leaving groups favor the E1cB mechanism, but as the leaving group improves, transition state BC^{‡} becomes lower in energy. First, the rate-determining step shifts: initially leaving-group elimination from intermediate B; it becomes deprotonation via transition state AB^{‡} (not pictured). Eventually, BC^{‡} is no longer stationary on the potential energy surface, and the reaction becomes a concerted E2 elimination (albeit very asynchronous in the diagrammed case).

== Activation ==
In S_{N}1 and E1 reactions, protonation or complexation with a Lewis acid commonly transform a poor leaving group into a good one. Then the reaction proceeds with (respectively) nucleophilic attack or elimination. For example, protonation before departure allows a molecule to formally lose such poor leaving groups as hydroxide.

The same principle applies in Friedel-Crafts reactions. There, a strong Lewis acid is required to generate a carbocation from an alkyl halide or an acylium ion from an acyl halide.

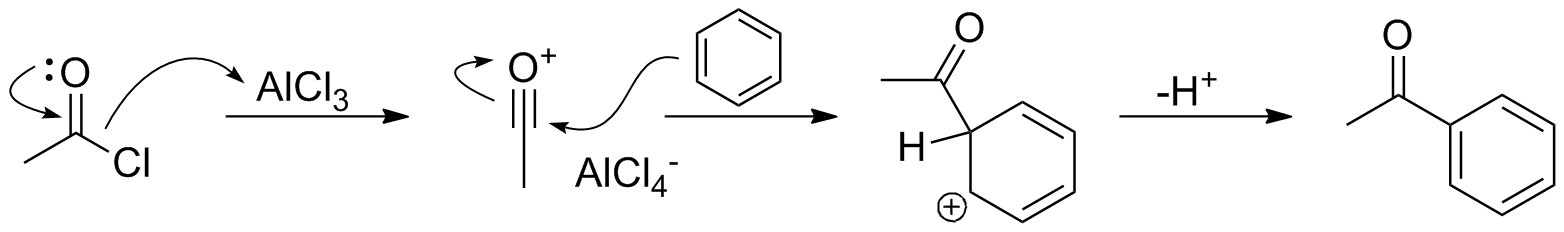

In Friedel-Crafts alkylations, the normal halogen leaving group order is reversed, and the reaction rate follows RF > RCl > RBr > RI. This effect is due to their greater ability to complex the Lewis acid catalyst. The actual group that leaves is an "ate" complex between the Lewis acid and the formal leaving group.

== Spontaneous departure ==
Any leaving group comparable to triflate is called a super leaving group; such compounds generally autoionize if the electrofuge can form a stable carbocation. Thus, the most commonly encountered organic triflates are alkenyl, aryl, and methyl triflates, of which none can form stable carbocations. Conversely, mixed acyl-triflyl anhydrides smoothly acylate arenes, where the corresponding acyl halides would require a strong Lewis acid catalyst.

Even more reactive are the hyper leaving groups, which are stronger than triflate and react with reductive elimination. Prominent hyper leaving groups include various halonium ions, such as diaryl iodonium salts; and other λ^{3}-iodanes.

Hyper leaving groups can be displaced by extraordinarily weak nucleophiles, in part because entropy favors splitting one molecule into three:

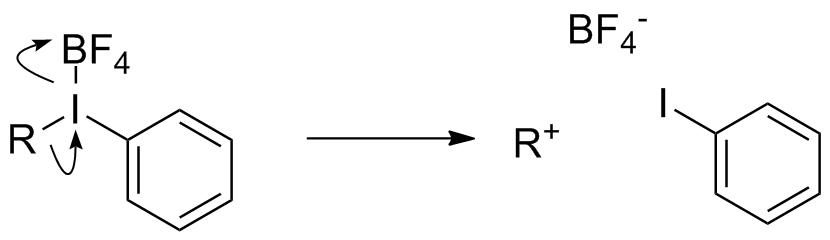
The ability of hyper leaving groups is enhanced by entropic factors

Heating neat samples of (CH_{3})_{2}Cl^{+} [CHB_{11}Cl_{11}]^{−} under reduced pressure methylates the very poorly nucleophilic carborane anion, with concomitant expulsion of the CH_{3}Cl leaving group. Likewise, dialkylhalonium hexafluoroantimonate salts alkylate other alkyl halides to give exchanged products.

In one study, reactivities increased in the order chloride (k_{rel} = 1), iodide (k_{rel} = 91), tosylate (k_{rel} = 3.7×10^{4}), triflate (k_{rel} = 1.4×10^{8}), phenyliodonium tetrafluoroborate (PhI^{+} BF^{−}_{4}, k_{rel} = 1.2×10^{14}). In general, leaving groups from dialkylhalonium ions increase in lability as RI < RBr < RCl.

== See also ==
- Entering group (a relatively uncommon term) — a species that bonds to a substrate-derived intermediate.
- Electrofuge
- Electrophile
- Elimination reaction
- Nucleofuge
- Nucleophile
- Substitution reaction
