= Japan Pharmaceutical Manufacturers Association =

Pharmaceutical industry trade group

The Japan Pharmaceutical Manufacturers Association (JPMA) is the organization representing the research-based pharmaceutical industry operating in Japan. It is an extension of the international AMR Industry Alliance formed in 2016 by the United Nations.

The JPMA has 74 members including 20 overseas affiliates (as of October 1, 2006).

== See also ==
- Juvenile Products Manufacturers Association (JPMA)
- European Federation of Pharmaceutical Industries and Associations (EFPIA)
- International Federation of Pharmaceutical Manufacturers Associations (IFPMA)
- Pharmaceutical Research and Manufacturers of America (PhRMA)
- Portuguese Pharmaceutical Industry Association
