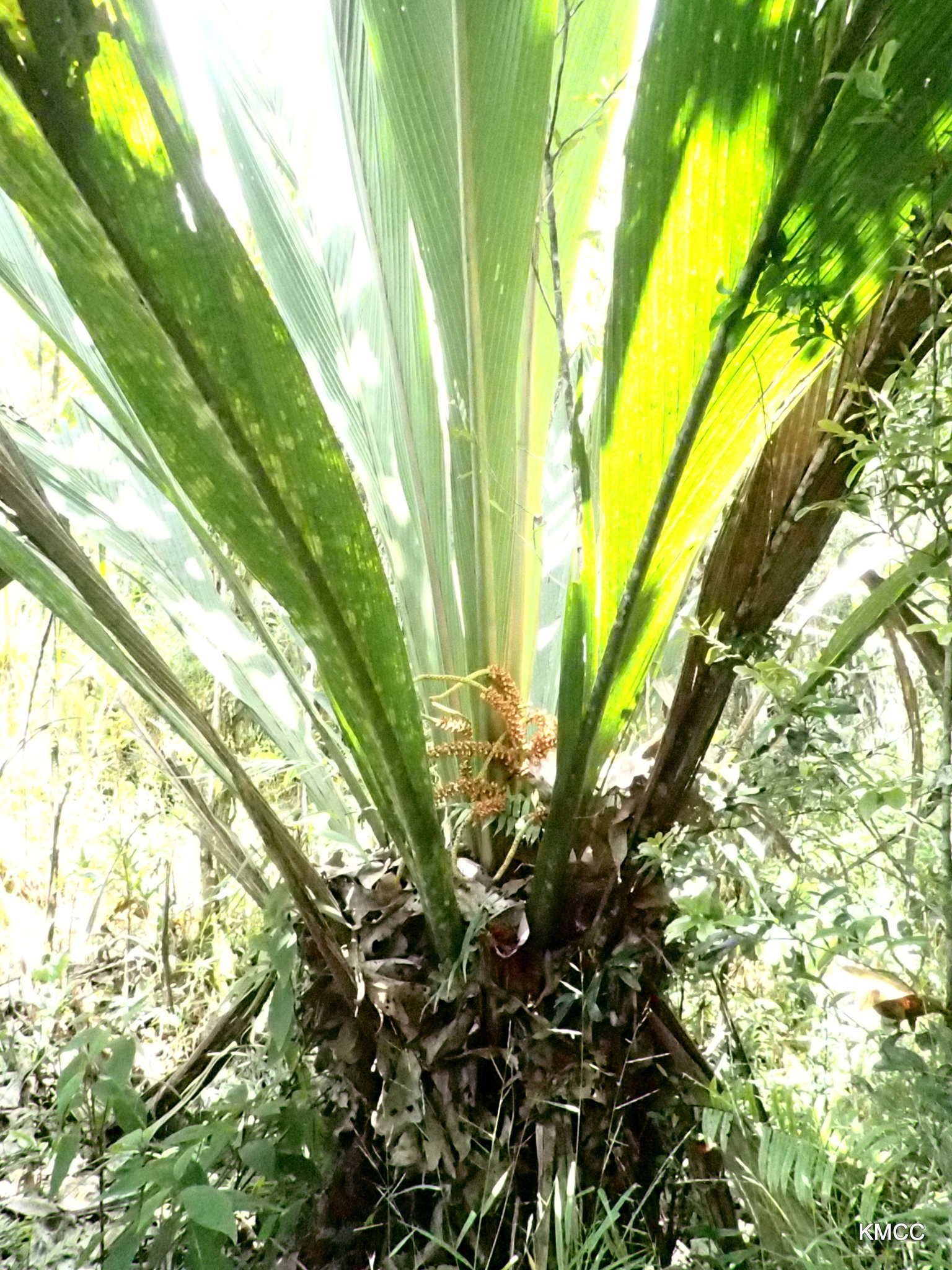
- Masoala kona

Scientific classification
- Kingdom: Plantae
- Clade: Tracheophytes
- Clade: Angiosperms
- Clade: Monocots
- Clade: Commelinids
- Order: Arecales
- Family: Arecaceae
- Subfamily: Arecoideae
- Tribe: Areceae
- Subtribe: Dypsidinae
- Genus: Masoala; Jum.

= Masoala =

Genus of palms

Masoala is a genus of flowering plant in the family Arecaceae. It contains the following species, both endemic to Madagascar:

- Masoala kona Beentje
- Masoala madagascariensis Jum.
