= Captive odorant =

Odorant used to protect perfumes from imitation

A captive odorant, or short captive, is an odorant or aroma chemical retained by the originating manufacturer for exclusive use in their own perfumes to protect them from imitation.

== Background ==
Perfume formulations cannot be protected by patents, and with the aid of modern analytic techniques, such as gas chromatography-mass spectrometry (GC-MS), it is relatively easy to analyze their composition, and thus to imitate a fragrance composed only of commercially available perfumery raw materials, such as essential oils and synthetic odorants sold on the market. New odorants can however be patented, and so the company that invented the material can decide not to sell a patented odorant but to keep it as a captive for their own perfumes only, thereby extending the patent protection for that compound on the perfume formulation, since the patented compound can only be produced by the patent owner. Thus, if the patent owner does not sell the compound on the market to the competition, his perfumes cannot be copied as long as the patent is valid. To be useful in that respect a captive odorant has to possess special odor characteristics that provide a signature effect on a fragrance. This signature effect on the fragrance should be unobtainable by other fragrance raw materials or mixtures thereof. The use of captives thus offers the respective fragrance company, at least for a limited time, a commercial advantage over their competitors. When the patent that covers the captive is close to expire, the material is generally released to the market. As the discovery and introduction of new odorants is very costly, only the big fragrance companies, such as Givaudan, Firmenich, IFF, Symrise and Takasago, can afford this strategy.

== Examples ==
Important examples of now released captives include Hedione in »Eau Sauvage« (C. Dior, 1966), Moxalone in »CK Be« (Calvin Klein, 1996), and Dynascone in »Cool Water« (Davidoff, 1988).
